= Basketry of Mexico =

Basket weaving in Mexico

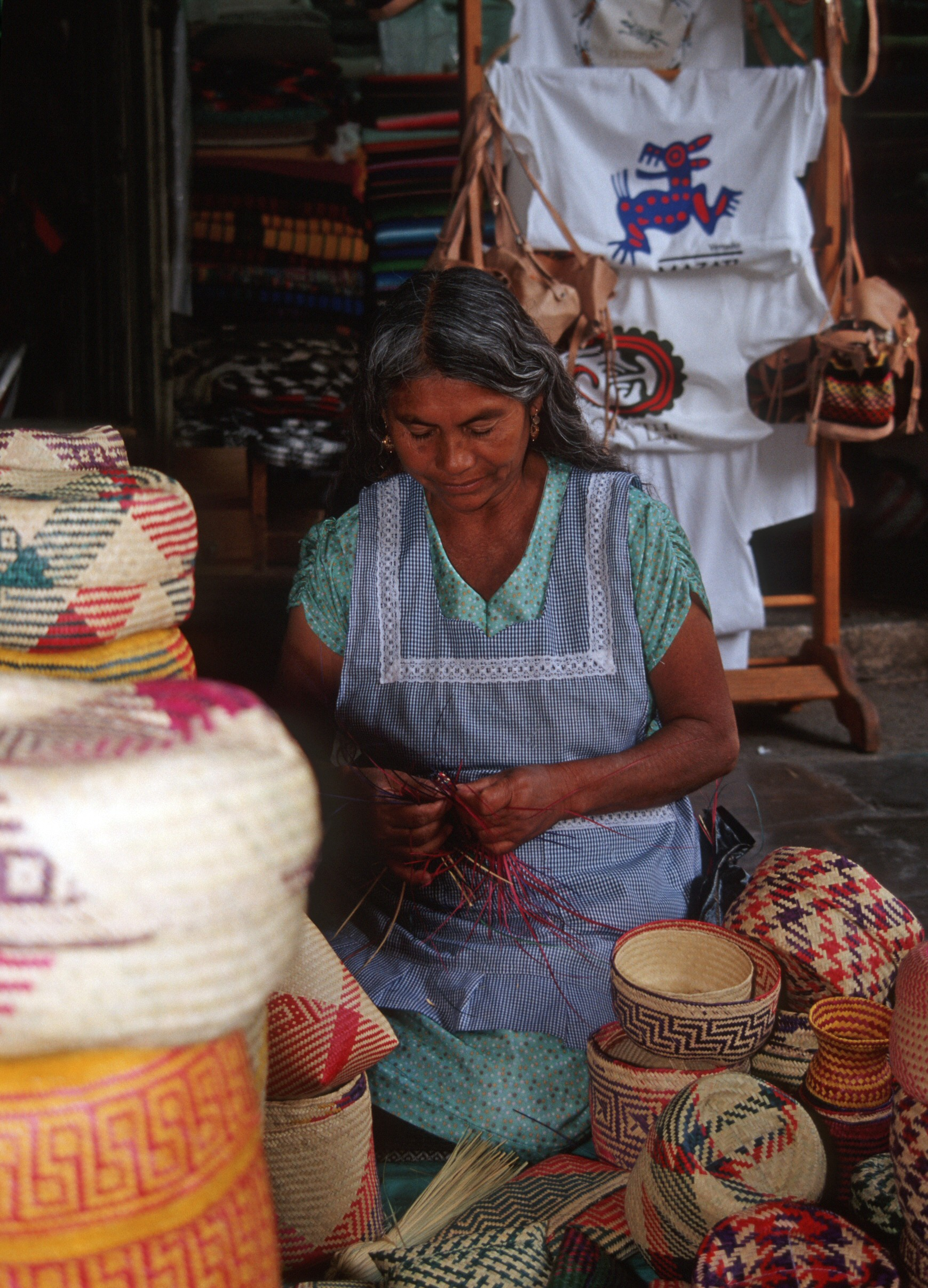
Woman weaving a basket in the Benito Juarez Market in the city of Oaxaca

Basketry of Mexico has its origins far into the pre Hispanic period, pre-dating ceramics and the domestication of crops. By the time the Spanish arrived, there were a number of indigenous forms, a number of which are still made today. These and products that the Spanish introduced form the combined tradition that remains today. Like other Mexican handcrafts, sales to tourists and collectors is important, but basketry is not as popular as other handcrafts. Basketry techniques and materials vary from region to region depending on the vegetation available (with about eighty species of plant use nationwide), with important traditions in Sonora, State of Mexico, Michoacán, Veracruz, Oaxaca and the Yucatán Peninsula.

== History ==
=== Pre Hispanic period ===
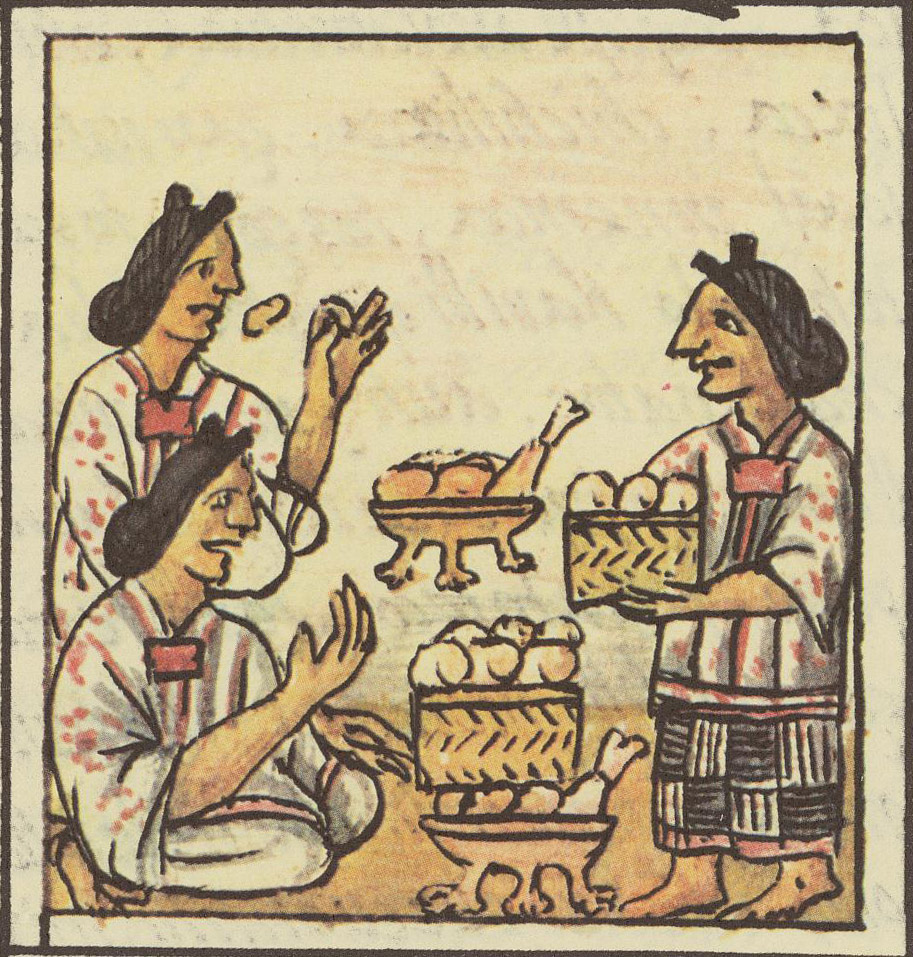
Scene from the Florentine Codex show food in baskets

Basketry was one of Mesoamerica’s oldest crafts, important since the early hunting-gathering period and predates both the manipulation of fire and the creation of pottery. The craft was originally developed from simple containers for gathering foodstuffs in nature and storage, to other items such as mats, boxes, chairs, cradles, sandals and some clothing items. Basketry in Mexico has two lineages, one indigenous and one Spanish, distinguished mostly by the products made. Many products that date back from the pre Hispanic period still survive such as mats called petates, carrying braces and baskets for the transport of wares to market. The last two were particularly important in the period because there were no beasts of burden, and merchandise was carried by men over land. Some pre Hispanic pieces were very finely woven with intricate designs, comparable to European tapestries.

Much of the history of basketmaking has been lost since baskets are biodegradable. There are only fragments of basketry from archeological records because of the degradation of the biological materials used to make them. The best finds have been in dry caves and rock croppings, as well as basket impressions in ceramics. Most of the finds have been in arid and semi-arid areas in the northwest of Mexico, with some found at the Ocampo and Romero caves in Tamaulipas, containing evidence of both coil and braided wares. Other significant finds include those at Coxcatlán Cave in Tehuacán, Puebla, Guila Naquitz, Oaxaca, the Gallo Caves and Chaguera Cave in Morelos, as well as in Michoacán and the Valley of Mexico. These include evidence of rope and bag making.

=== Colonial period ===
As no complete pieces survive, the best evidence of pre-Hispanic and colonial period basketry forms is from contemporary codices such as the Mendocino Codex, written chronicles and pieces that appear in paintings. They confirm the existence of indigenous products such as petates, seats (tollicpalli), seats with back (tepotzoicpali), chiquihuites, tanates, tompeates, boxes (petlanali), sandals, nets, fans, mecapals (carrying braces) and more. They also indicate that a number of products and techniques have since disappeared. For example, in the Valley of Mexico, lakeside communities such as Xochimilco and Xoltocan were dedicated to making items such as petates from the rushes growing at the water's edge. However, this has died out with the draining of the lakes.

Indigenous artisans continued to make basketry through the entire colonial period. Unlike other handcrafts, it was considered completely domestic and therefore not regulated like ceramics and woodworking, nor was there any formal teaching by Spanish missionaries. However, European designs, such as baskets with handles, sombreros, palms braided for Palm Sunday and heart decorations were introduced, along with the working of wheat and rye straw.

=== 19th century ===
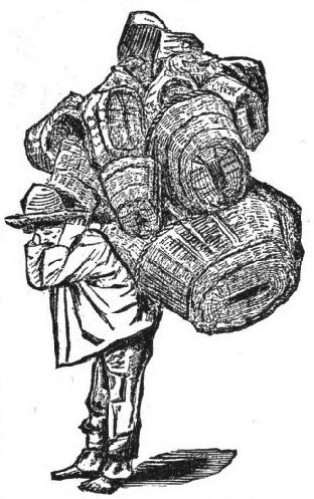
Drawing of a man carrying baskets, dated 1888

Likewise, no pieces from the 19th century survive, but at that time, the painting of everyday scenes became more popular, including images of homes, which show the survival of indigenous items like petates, along with sombreros and European style baskets. European travelers in Mexico documented what they saw, including the lives of common people, with baskets getting mentioned. One item noted in the records of this time but not before is that of the capote, a kind of rain cape created with layers of palm fronds.

=== 20th century to the present ===
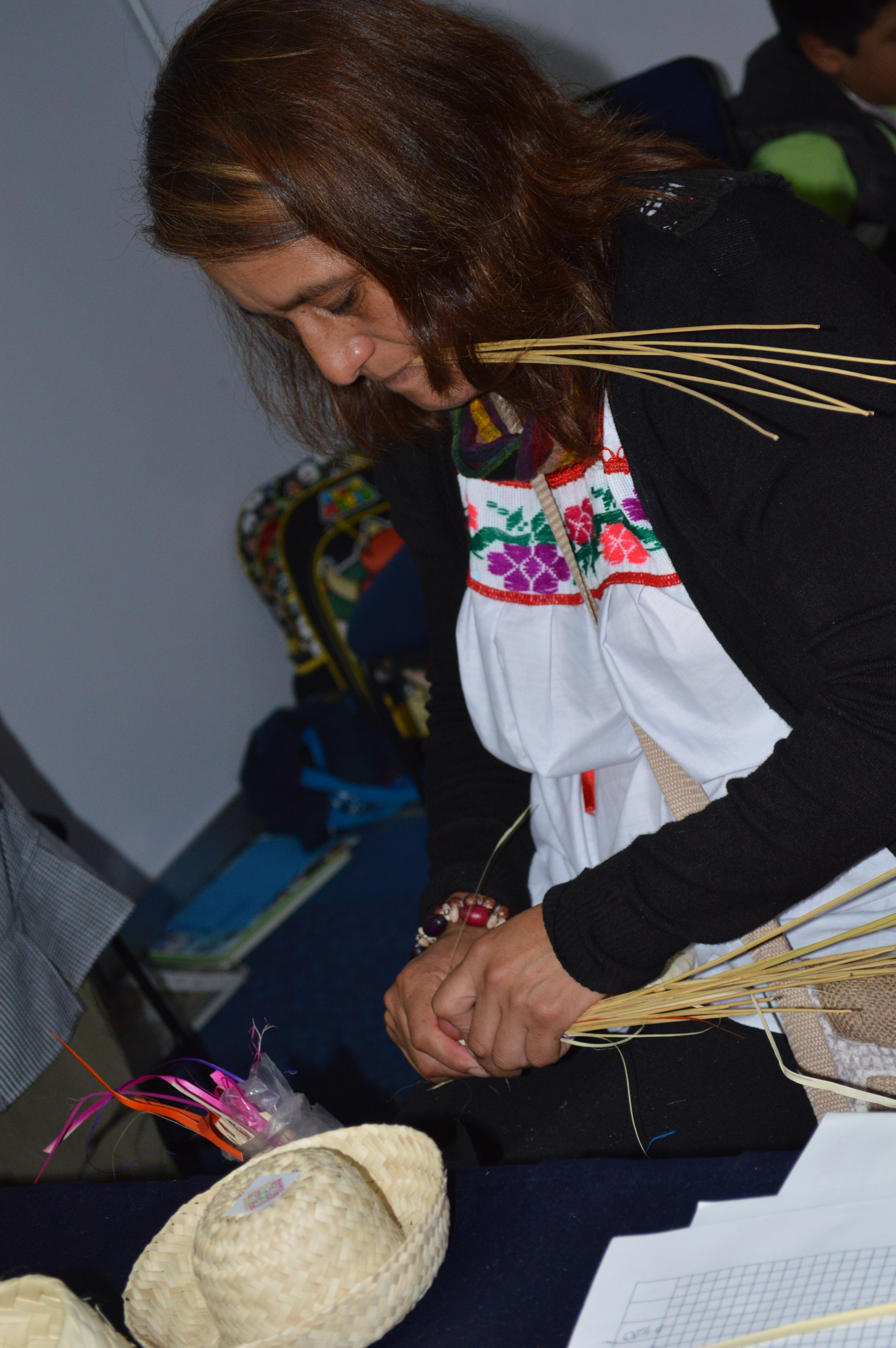
Weaving reeds together

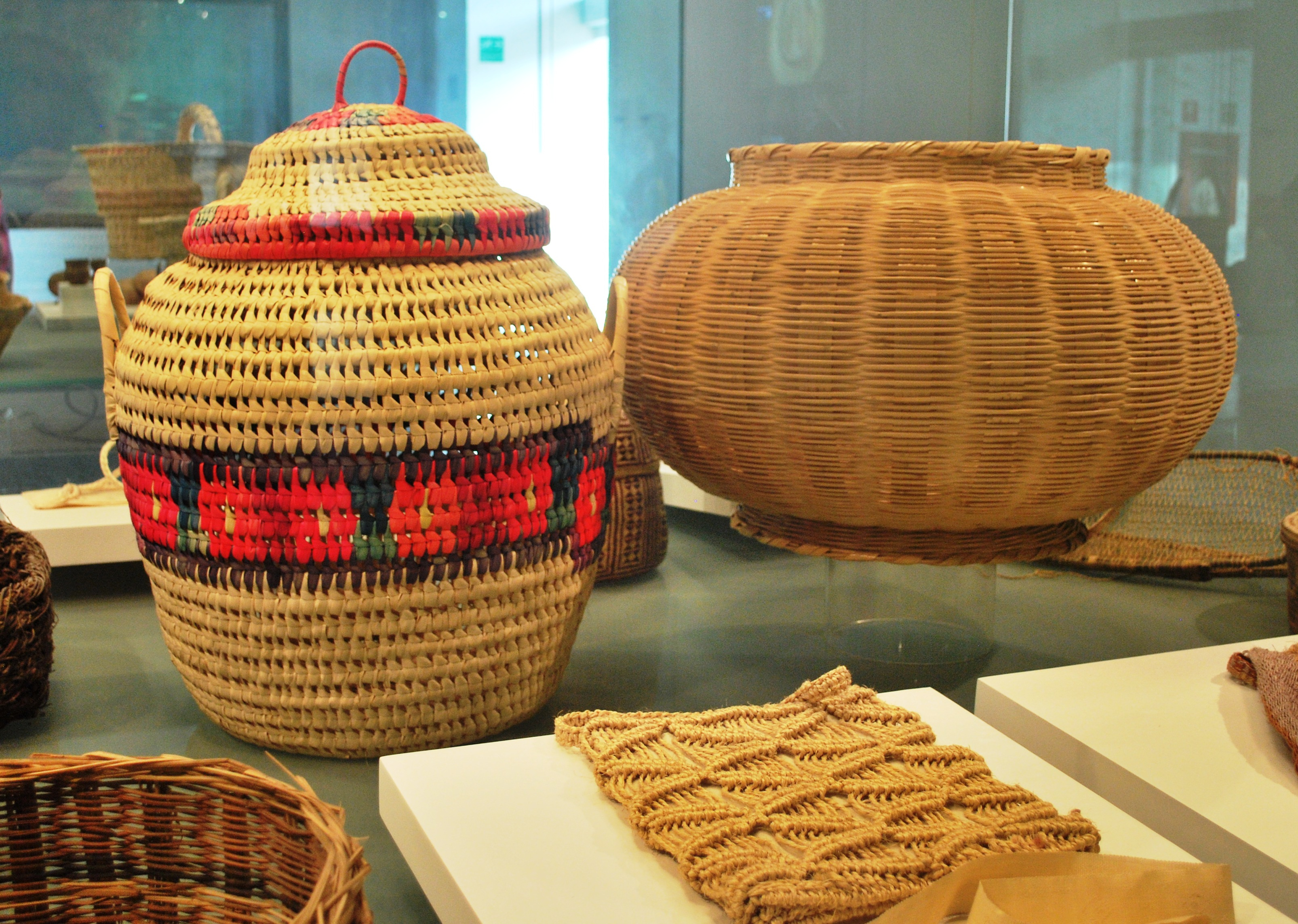
Basket display at the Museo de Arte Popular in Mexico City

The early 20th century saw a revived interest in Mexico's handcraft traditions, including basketry. During the early 20th century the making of hats from palm and other fibers was taught to prisoners in municipal jails, something that survives to the present. Writer Manuel Toussaint noted the quantity and quality of baskets he found in Oaxaca during his travels, along with those in Puebla and the State of Mexico. For the 100th anniversary of the conclusion of the Mexican War of Independence, artists such as Dr. Atl, Roberto Montenegro and others organized an exhibition of the country's handcrafts and folk art. The exhibition resulted in a large catalog, of which Chapter 16 was dedicated to basketry. It provides a snapshot of the state of the craft at the end of the 19th century and beginning of the 20th. In this catalog, Dr Atl affirms that the most important basketry item remained the petate, noted the use of tenates as basic utilitarian items, with documentation of the large basketry production in the states of Puebla, State of Mexico, Guanajuato, Michoacán and Jalisco. The creation of miniature figures from Silao, Irapuato, Guanajuato and Santa María del Río, SLP are also mentioned. However mention of the work done in the north of the country is absent.

Despite the interest in documenting handcraft traditions, no complete pieces from before the 1960s remain. Although not as popular as other handcraft traditions, basketry can be found all over Mexico, especially in indigenous communities in Oaxaca, Chiapas and Veracruz, with many created for collectors. However, a number of basketry items are still make for local use, such as a cradle used by indigenous women in the Sierra Norte of Puebla, and pieces created for ceremonies in various parts of Mexico, such as special baskets created by the Seri in Sonora and the Nahuas in the Huasteca region for Day of the Dead.

Most artisans make the items part-time, as a complement to other economic activities, and workshops are based in family homes, with various members participating. Some artisans have organized into cooperatives to promote their work. However, most basketry products are easily replaced by manufactured goods, and in areas the resources needed to make them are becoming scarce. Basketry has declined in Mexico with the introduction of plastic containers in the 1970s and similar products imported from Asian since 2005. For these and other reasons, basketry is not as important a handcraft as others such as ceramics, but it still plays an important domestic and commercial roles in rural communities in states such as Guerrero, State of Mexico, Oaxaca, Puebla, Sonora, Michoacán and Veracruz.

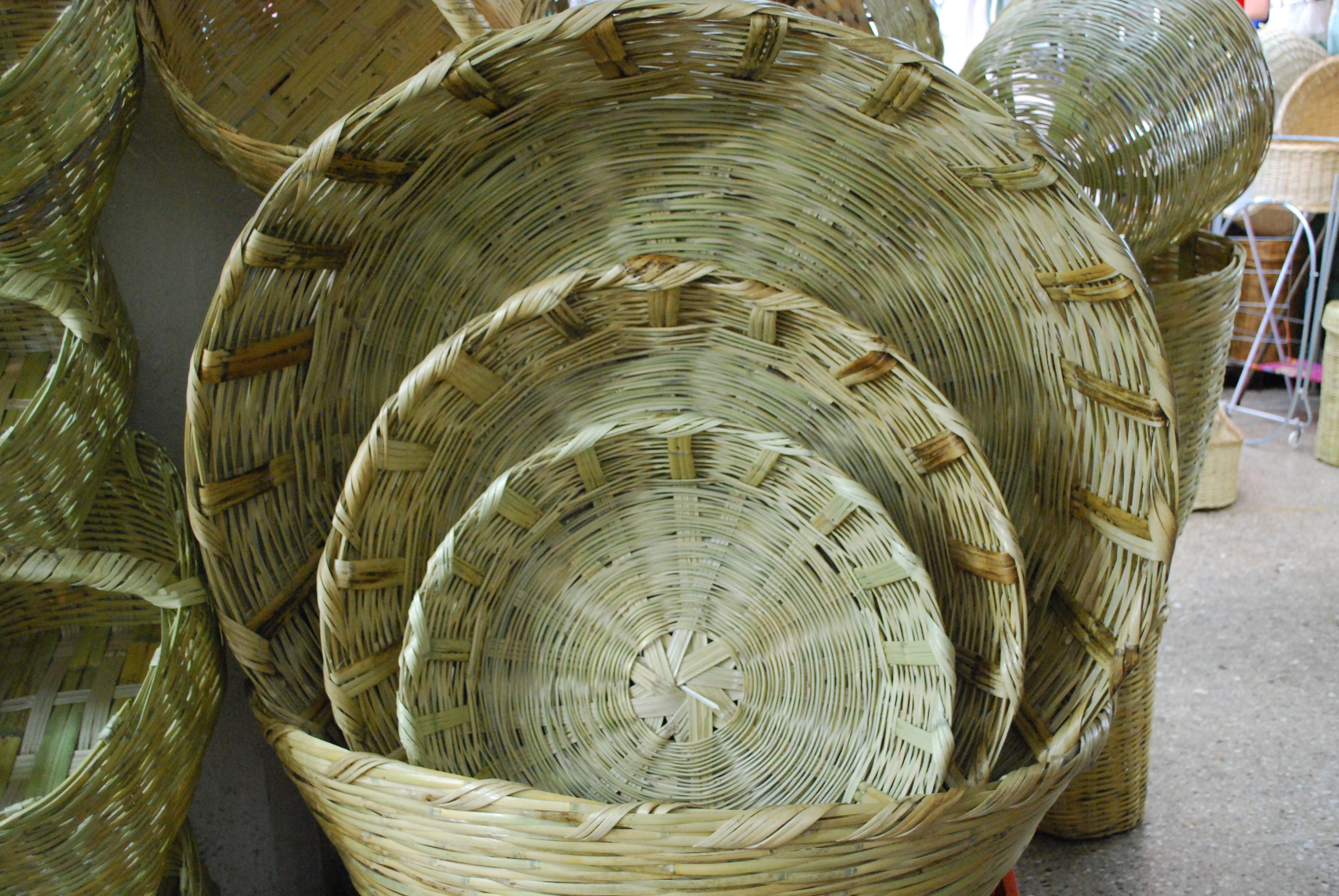
Baskets for bread vendors at the La Merced Market

A microcosm of the basketry market is in the La Merced Market in Mexico City, which sells products from Puebla, Tlaxcala, Querétaro, Michoacán, State of Mexico, Guerrero and San Luis Potosí. There are about 30 stalls selling basketry products in La Merced, many of which have been passed down through the generations. Most of the sales are to other merchants, such as those who sell tacos de canasta, traditional sweets and bakeries. Many of the sales occur in conjunction with certain celebrations. Holy Week sees the sales of baskets and palms. For Day of the Dead, petates, chiquihuites and small baskets are bought as altar decorations. For Christmas, baskets are used to hold food and traditional decorations. Many of these sales are to people from the edges of Mexico City where traditions survive better. However, many of these stalls must now offer cheaper Asian made goods along with other items in order to stay in business.

Where tourism has a favorable impact on conserving basketry traditions, it tends to have a negative effect on the resources used to make the products because of demand.

== Materials ==
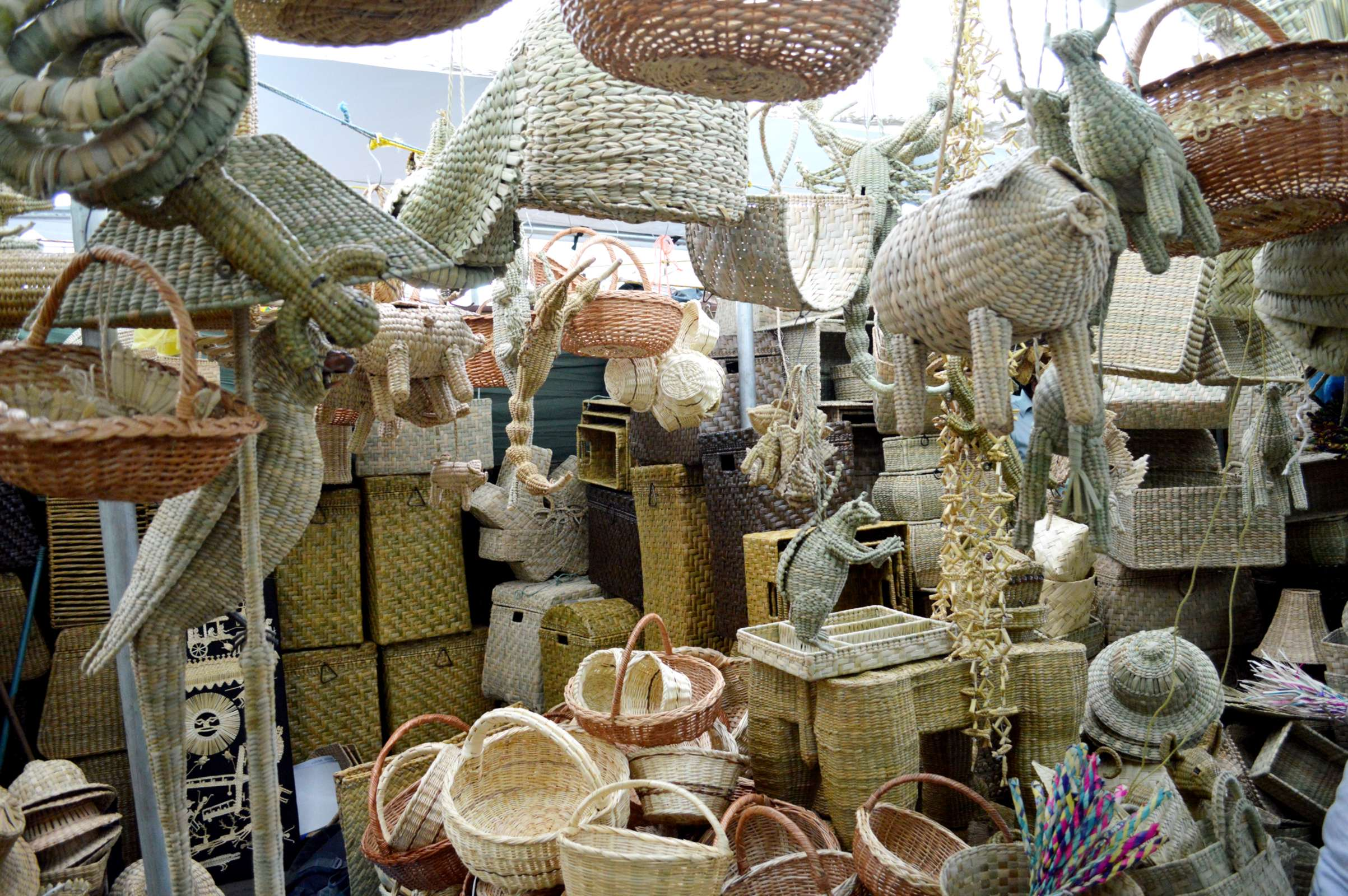
Reed basketry products at the Palm Sunday Handcraft Market in Uruapan, Michoacán

Basketry is related to other textiles arts, except that the plant fibers used are stiffer, ranging from rigid, hard works made from branches or strips of wood to the nearly cloth-like pieces from leaf fibers such as ixtle (maguey fiber) and henequen. Apart from ixtle and henequen, the vegetation used can be divided into two types: hard or semi rigid, which include materials such as wood strips and willow branches or canes to softer materials such as palm fronds, reeds, straw and other plant stems. The latter materials create items of more flexibility than the first. The materials used in a give location vary, depending on the local vegetation, and since it mostly depends on plant fibers, it is mostly a rural occupation, being close to sources. Materials may be mixed in the making of a piece, generally to provide patterns and textures, sometimes color.

Since most materials are taken from the wild, basketry affects the surrounding ecosystems to varying degrees. In Mexico about eighty species of plants are used in basketry from twenty botanical families. These include agaves (Agavefourcroydes, A. sisalana, A. letonae, A. zapupe, A. funkiana), rushes and reeds (Arundo donax, Phragmites communis), palms (Acanthorriza mocinni, Brahea dulcis, Sabal mexicana, S. causiarum, Acrocomia crispa), yucca (Yucca glauca, Y. elata, Y. treculeana, Y. mohavensis, Y. baccata), and various others (Smilacaceae, Bignoniaceae, Araceae, Dilleniaceae, Sapindaceae). It also includes the use of some trees such as willow (Salicaceae), pines (Pinaceae) and aquatic plants such as the lily (Eichhornia crassipes) and thalia (Thalia sp.). Cultivated plant fibers include wheat and rye straw, along with hennequin. In the past decades new materials have made their way into Mexican basketry including synthetic fiber strips, chains, metal rings, cloth strips and leather.

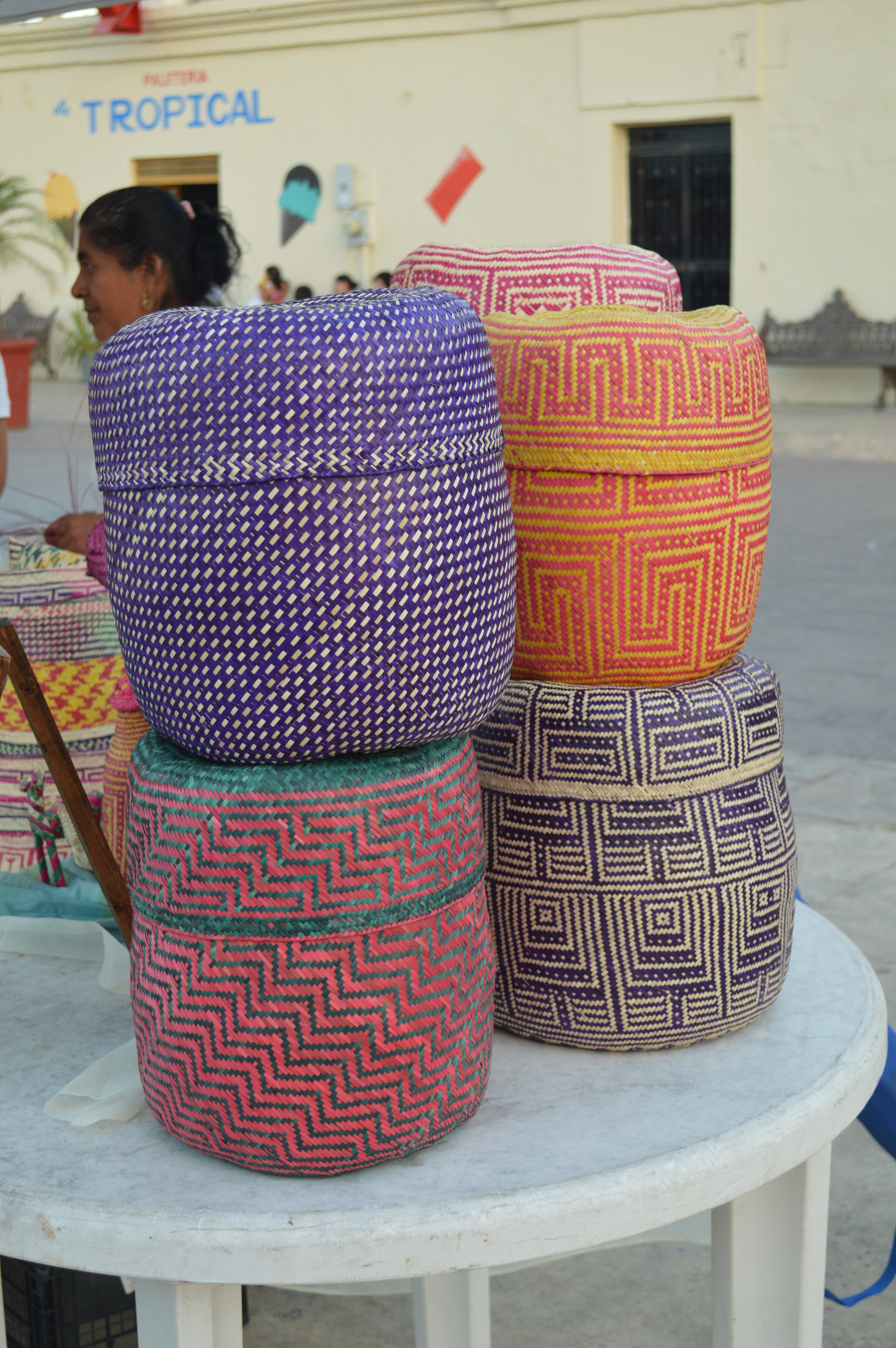
Baskets made with synthetic fibers at San Jose del Cabo, Baja California Sur

Hennequin and ixtle work does not use the entire plant, but rather fibers are extracted from the plant. Hennequin is grown in the Yucatán Peninsula and ixtle may be grown or gathered from wild plants in semi arid areas in various parts of Mexico. Both have been used to create string carrying bags, and nets, which hennequin having great value in the past in the making of rope.

In the latter 20th century, the development of synthetic fibers, particularly polypropolene and polyethylene as provided artisans with often cheaper and more colorful alternatives, important in areas where natural plant fibers have become scarce. However, they have not replaced the use of natural materials. One community particularly noted for their work in these strips is Zapotitlán Palmas in Oaxaca.

== Basketry products ==
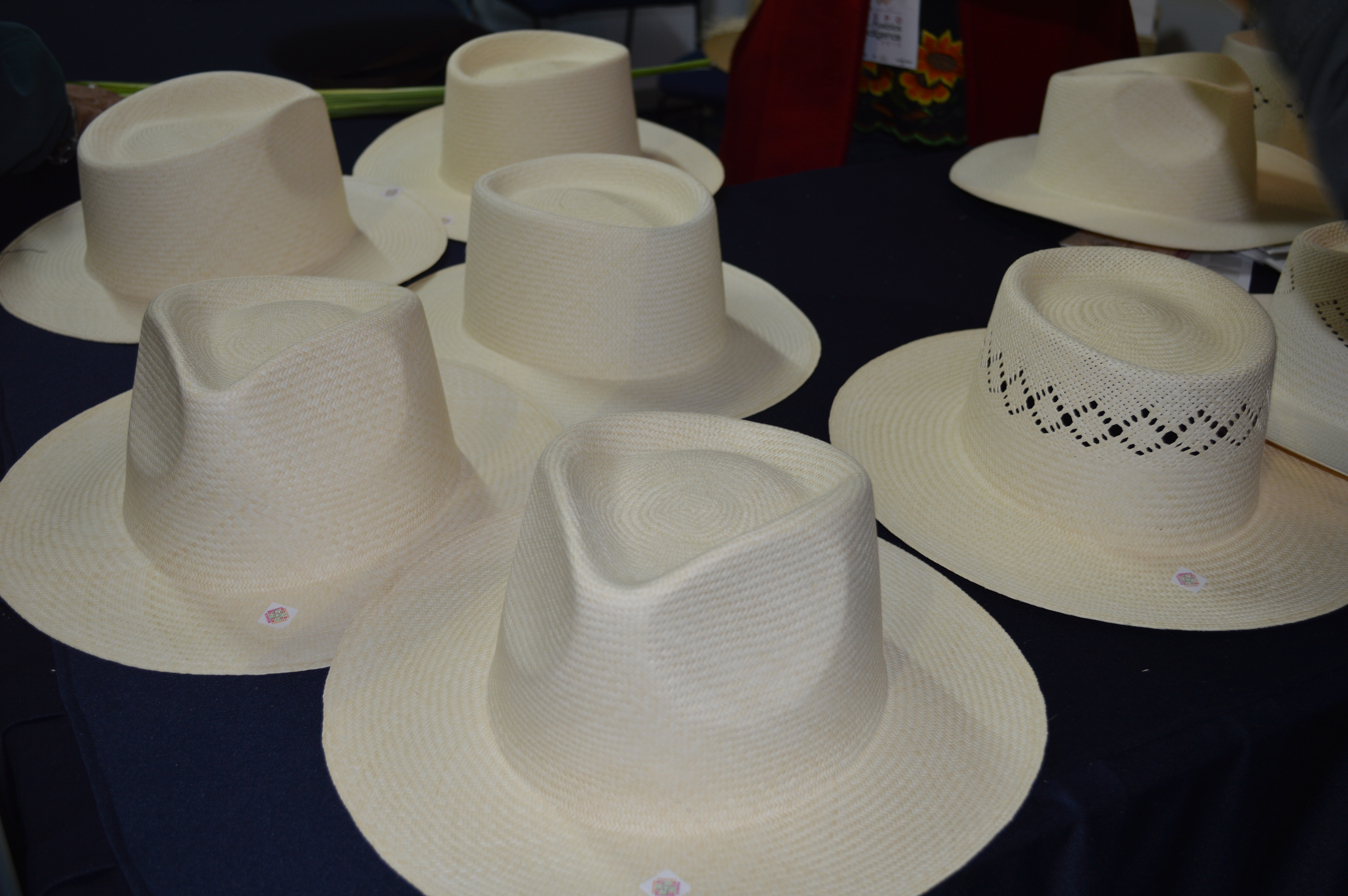
Finely woven hats from "jipi" palm made in Calkini, Campeche

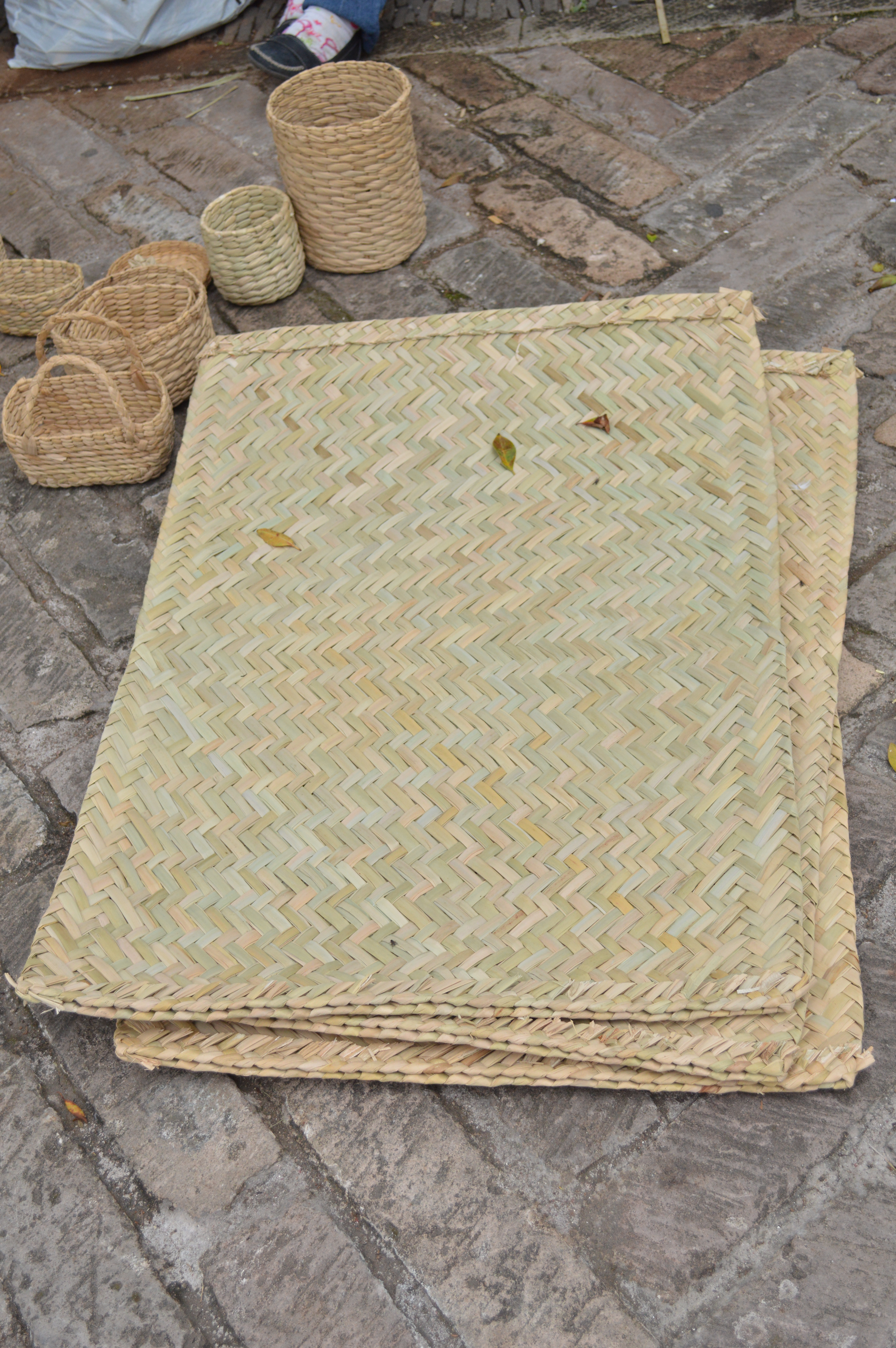
Reed petates

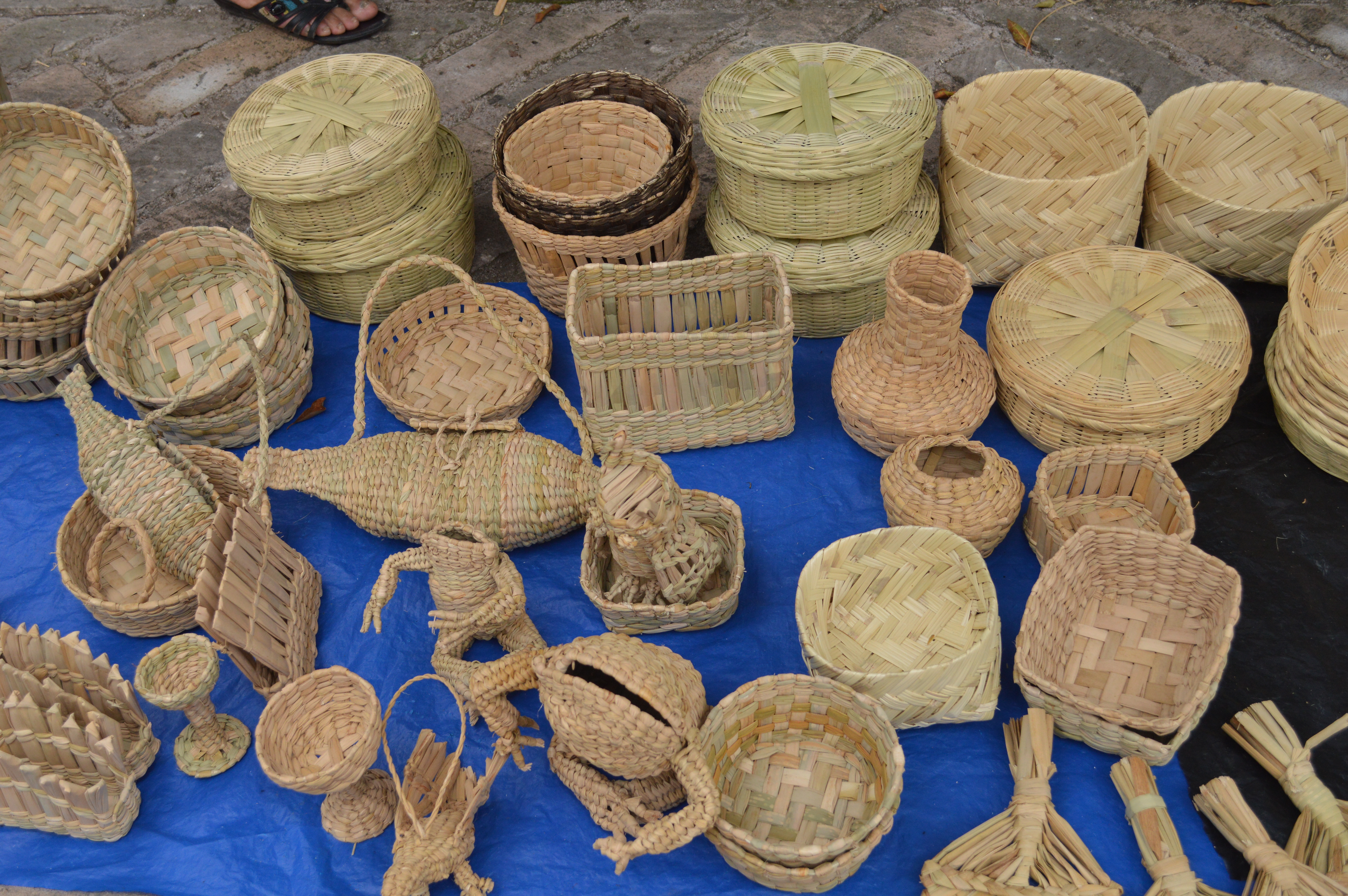
Basketry products on the street in Michoacán

Basketry items are generally of three types, flat items, two- or three dimensional forms for carrying or those used for storage. Most of these are utilitarian, used then thrown away when worn out. Basketry in Mexico has two lineages. Indigenous products include petates, tompeates, peacas,mecapales and soyetes, many of which survive to the present day.

Petates are large flat mats made from reeds or palm fronds. Those made with the latter have wider weaves. They have been used to wrap bundles, to sleep on, bury the dead and event to celebrate marriages. They are still relatively common, especially in indigenous communities. Tompeates or tenates were made to store and transport fruit, vegetables and other merchandise for market. In the pre-Hispanic and early colonial period, they were tied on a person's back with a mecapal (brace) to transport as there were no beasts of burden in the pre Hispanic period. Today the term is still used in some areas to refer to a container used to keep tortillas warm. Sometimes the term tlaxcal is used instead. Petacas were large containers used to store clothing, and in the pre Hispanic and colonial period may have been the only furniture like piece in houses of the poor.

Cacles, capotes and soyates were clothing items.

Items introduced by the Spanish include handled baskets, sombreros makes with braided fibers, pizcadores, braided palm fronds for Palm Sunday, and heart decorations makes with straw (corazones de trigo).

Today, many of these items may be found. The most common items include handled baskets, tortilla holders, chairs, toys (generally miniatures of animals and objects, along with dolls), flowers, spheres and bags. Another common item is the soplador, a kind of fan used to fan charcoal fires. Palm fronds are woven into intricate designs for Palm Sunday. In Veracruz, basketry techniques are used to create traps for fish flowing in rivers. Ixtle and hennequin are still used, most commonly for the creation of bags and nets, and in the case of ixtle, as a kind of embroidery thread for leather.

== Basketry techniques ==
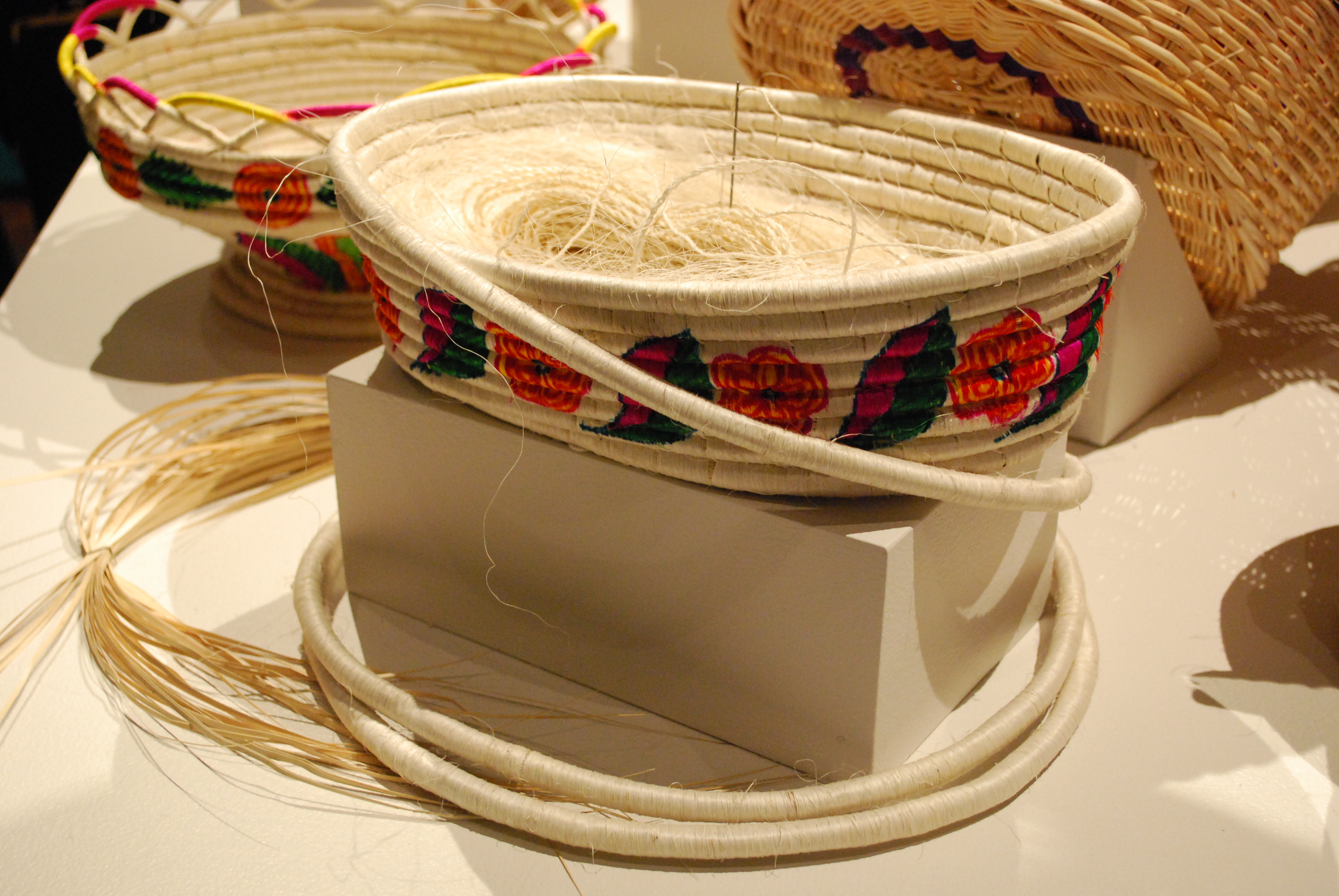
Coil basket in progress

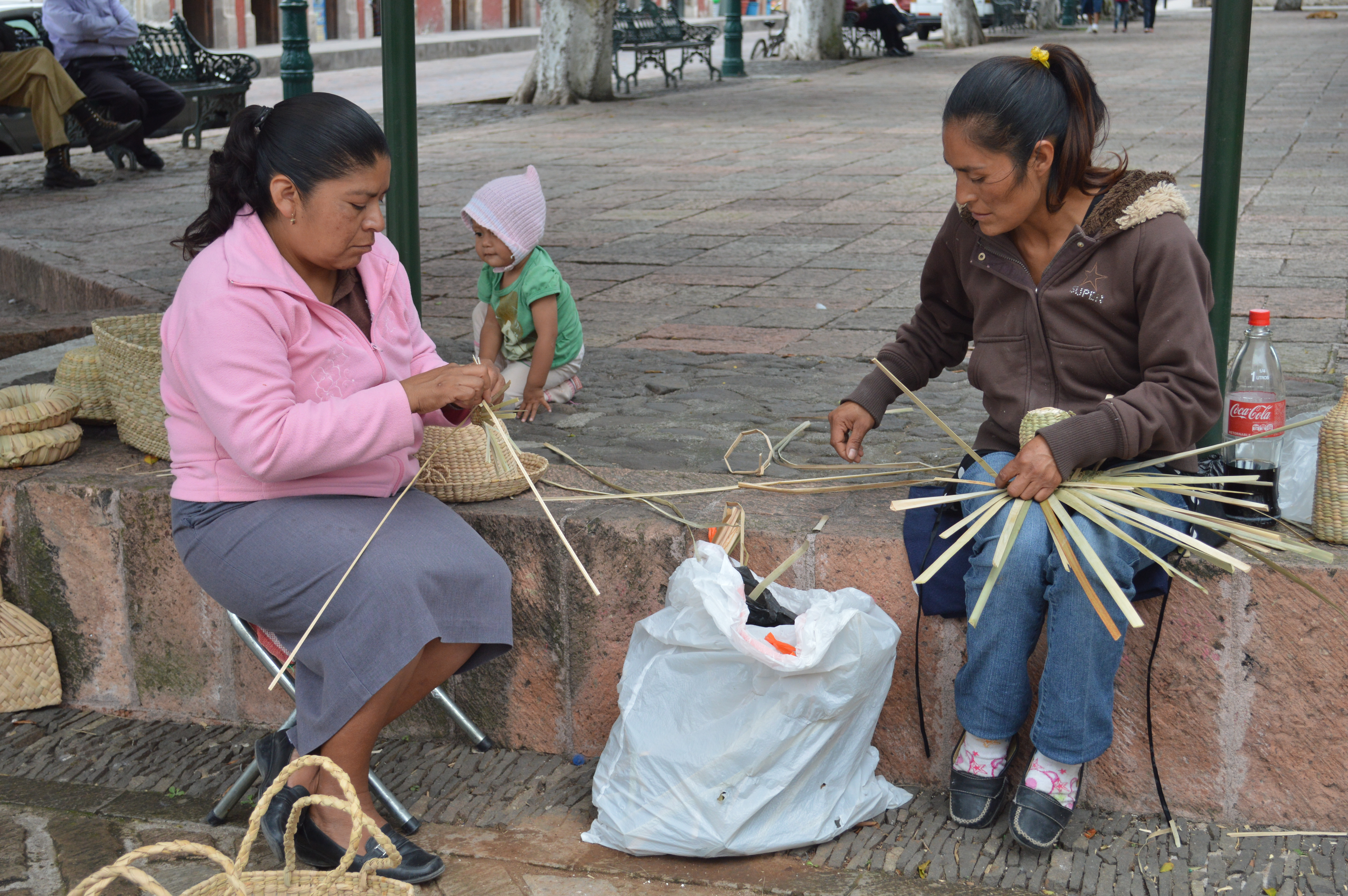
Women making baskets with the weaving technique in Cuitzeo, Michoacán

There are several main techniques associated with the making of basketry in Mexico, coils, braiding. weaving and twisting. The techniques used vary widely over the country as it depends on the available raw materials. Three dimensional object have three parts, a center, from which the process begins, walls (sides) and edges. The oldest technique is the coil, where fibers are pressed together, coiled onto themselves and held in place by sewing them. Vestiges of this types have been found and dated archeologically, with the best-known example today being the corita baskets of the Seri people. One other technique is the twisting of fibers on themselves. This is combined with weaving in mixed technique pieces. Woven pieces start with two or more cross pieces and the thinner pieces woven over them. It is generally used to create containers, carrying pieces and mats and is the most versatile. The braiding technique is most commonly used for the making of hats.

Baskets are decorated in several ways: painting, changes in technique as the piece takes shape and the use of materials of different colors and textures. When painting is chosen, it is applied to a finished piece. Sometimes other elements are added to finished pieces, such as stitching, shells and feathers.

As working with ixtle and hennequin require different techniques, such as separating the fibers from the rest of the plant, this work is subclassified in Mexico under the name of jarciería.

== Regional traditions ==
The main basketry styles are North, Center, Mixtec/Oaxaca, Gulf of Mexico and the Southeast, principally divided by the types of plant matter used as raw material.

=== Central Mexico ===
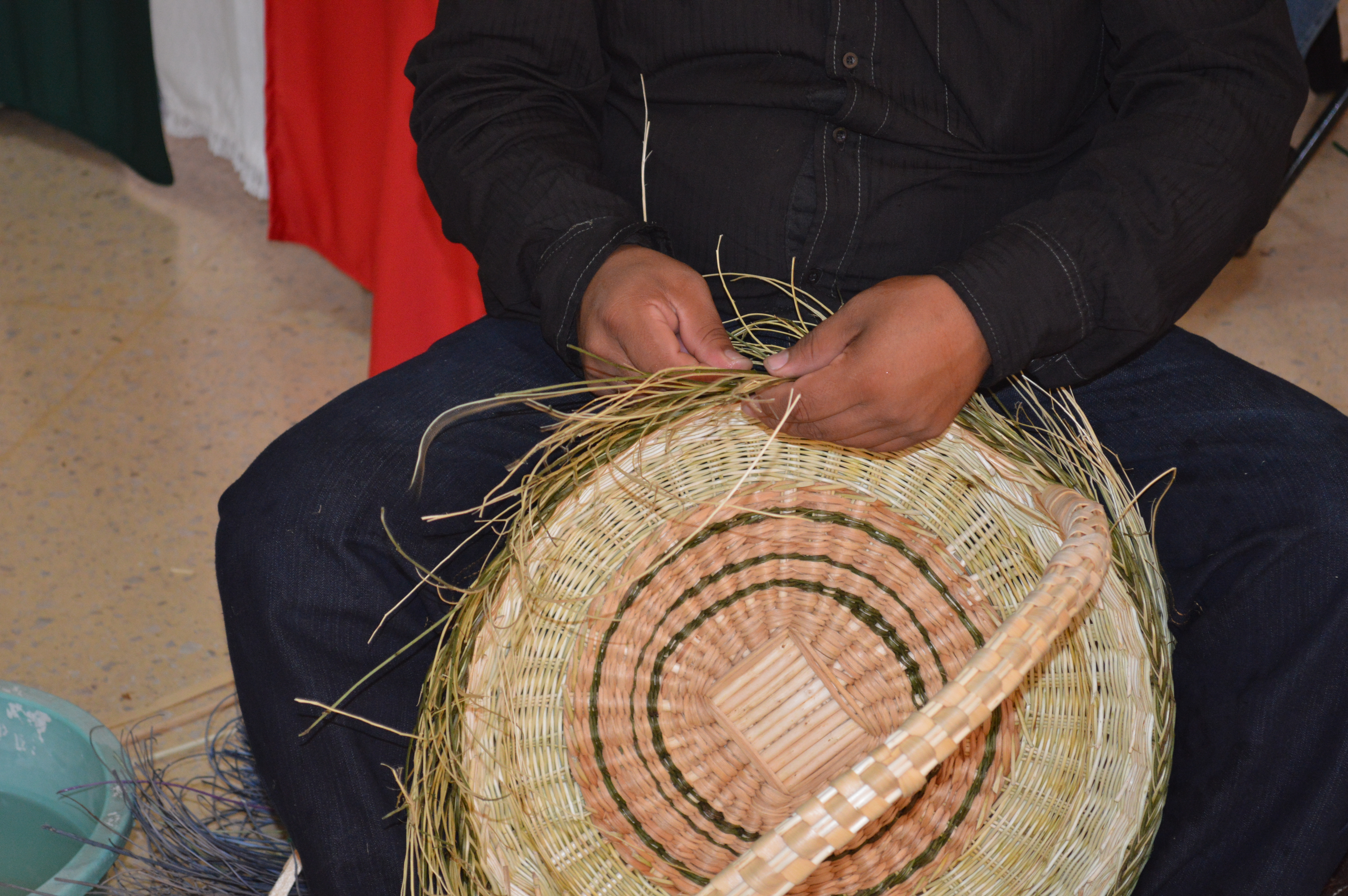
Basket in progress in Tenancingo, State of Mexico

The basketry of the Center of the country covers the states of Jalisco, Michoacan, Guanajuato, Aguascalientes, San Luis Potosí, Querétaro, Hidalgo, State of Mexico and Morelos. The basketry tradition here is mixed, mostly of European techniques and designs but indigenous forms are still produced. The most common materials include rushes and reeds, especially in the State of Mexico, Morelos and Hidalgo, around the shores of the Lerma and Tultepec rivers, Lake Cuitzeo, Lake Patzcuaro and Lake Chapala. The working of willow branches to make baskets is also common. Palm fronds are worked in warmer climates from Matehuala, San Luis Potosi, south to the state of Morelos, mostly to make petates, fanes and tenates. In the Tierra Caliente of Michoacán, palm fronds are produced in abundance and are used to create sombreros, tenates, fans, brooms and capotes (rain capes).

In the State of Mexico, most basketry artisans are indigenous people, most of whom live in Jiquipilco, Temascalcingo, Tenancingo and Toluca (San Andrés Cuexcontitlán and San Cristobal Huichochitlan neighborhoods). A wide variety of products are made from handled baskedts, tortilla keepers, bags, placemats and more, with many having several colors, generally from dying the fibers in different colors. Artisans in the municipality of Tenancingo use ten species of plants. In Amanalco, Donato Guerra and El Oro, baskets are made that include ornaments of high fire ceramics, nickel-plated brass and glass. In Santa Ana Tepaltitlán palm fronds are dyed in bright colors and the spiral method is used. The town used to produce an abundance of very fine handled baskets and other wares with animal and human decorative motifs. However, only a few such artisans remain. Younger artisans make cruder pieces and often make simpler geometric motifs.

In Michoacán, basketry items are likewise varied, from baskets and other containers of varying sizes, miniatures, toys and decorative items. The working of wheat straw is also common, most traditionally to make heart-shaped figures for kitchens along with other decorative figures such as a suns, moons, nativity and other Biblical scenes. In Zacán, there are still some older artisans who make sombreros using ixtle, which are waterproof and traditionally used for fieldwork. In Uripitío a plant called cucharilla is used to make petates and fans. Sombrero for charros are also made along in neighboring Jalisco state as well as San Francisco del Rincón, Manuel Doblado and Tierra Blanca, Guanajuato. The main basket producers in Guanajuato are the towns of Ichupio and Queréndaro, whose main clients are the strawberry farms in and around Irapuato. In Silao, miniatures and toys are made with basketry techniques.

In the Sierra Norte of Puebla, Otomis and Nahuas create cradles and carrying bags using jonote bark, a tradition date back far into the pre Hispanic period. The community of Santa Cruz, Puebla still creates fine petates with geometric designs. Those of Santa María Chigmecatitlan create miniatures of figures such as musicians and circus performers along with complete nativity scenes.

In Guerrero state decorative baskets are made with geometric and animal motifs with palm fronds dyed in various colors.

=== Mixtec/Oaxaca ===
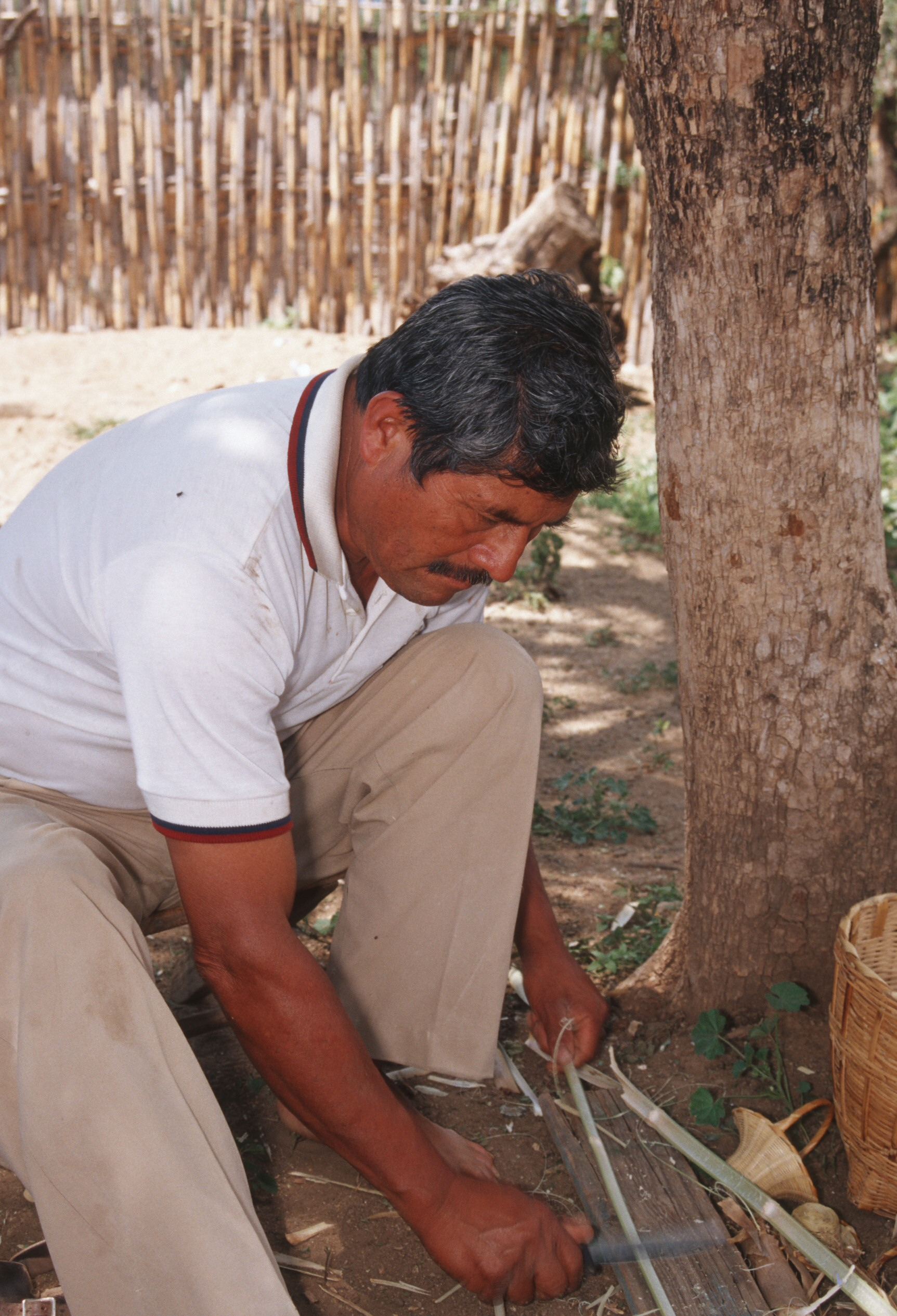
Artisan Amador Martínez Antonio, preparing materials in Santa Cruz Papalutla, Oaxaca

Basketry made with reeds and rushes is done in various regions in the state of Oaxaca, such as the Central Valleys, the Miahuatlán Valley, the Mixtec region and Tehuantepec, mostly baskets for the transport of merchandise. Most of these wares originally were for carrying merchandise to market, along with petates and tenates. From the mid 1980s, Oaxacan basketry, especially in the Central Valleys as incorporated Asian elements into their designs. Amador Martinez went to China to learn bamboo basketry. When he returned, he taught other artisans what he had learned. The new forms have also been incorporated in the basketry workshops of the prisons in Tlacolula and Ocotlán. The new forms and decorations have had steady levels of increasing acceptance in the region.

The best known basketry of the state is done by the Mixtecs, whose territory extends over parts of Oaxaca, Puebla and Guerrero. Traditionally their work was almost exclusively done with palm fronds and noted in the Sierra Codex. However, environmental degradation has made this raw material scarce, putting the craft in danger. Those who still work with it create petates, soyates, fans, tenates and sombreros, and for a number of households, it is their only source of income. The old fretwork decorative designs have almost disappeared, but people can still be seen working the fronds in various public spaces. Despite this, the finest petates are made in this region, along with the town of San Luis Amatlán. There are programs to support basket makers in the Mixtec area of Oaxaca, such as FIDEPAL (Fideicomiso de la Palma), a society dedicated to conserving and promoting the craft.

One other noted town in the Oaxaca Mixtec region is Zapotitlan Palmas, near Huajuapan de León. Before the 1980s they made their wares exclusively with a species of palm (Sabal mexicana Mart), but since then they have switched to polyethylene fiber for merchandise to be sold outside of the town mostly in Huajuapan, with palm frond work reserved for personal use.

=== North ===
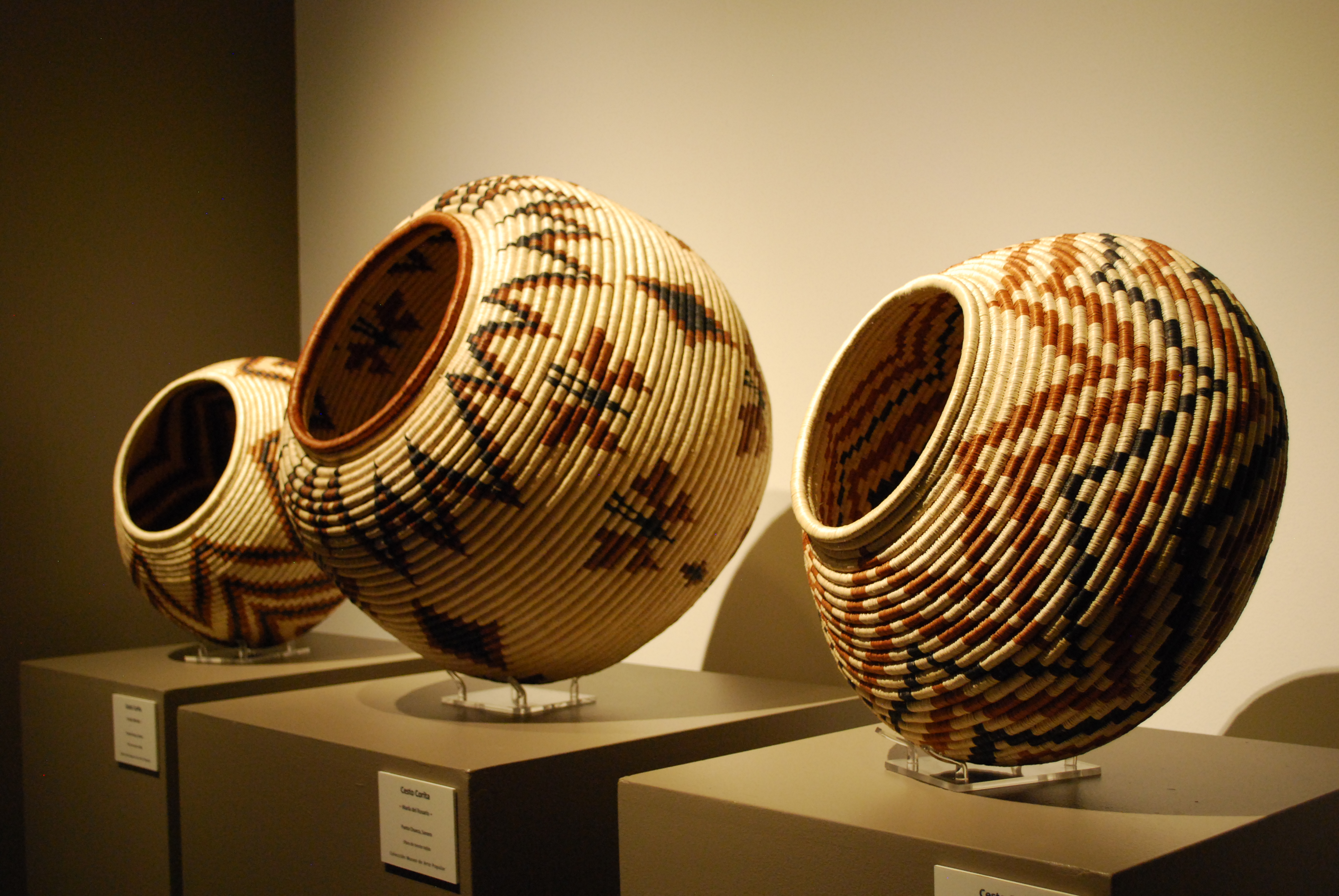
A corita basket on display at the Museo de Arte Popular in Mexico City

The basketry of the North covers work done in the states of Baja California, Baja California Sur, Sonora, Chihuahua, Coahuila, Nuevo León, Tamaulipas, Sinaloa, Nayarit, Durango and Zacatecas.

The Seri people in Sonora have one of the best-known basketry traditions, with the most important items being a kind of basket called the corita. Until the popularity of ironwood carvings, baskets were the main notable craft of the Seri. Coritas are mad with the branches of a brush or bush called torote (jatropha cuneatas), which grows in the desert. Except for shoulder yokes used to carry bundles on the back, baskets were used to transport everything except liquids by the Seri. Shallow baskets were carried on the head by Seri women, balanced by the use of a head ring and carried everything from wood, harvests, meat and clothes. Baskets were used for winnowing and storage. The served as suitcases, buckets and refuse containers.

Seri baskets are heavy made of bundles of split torote wrapped with the more flexible inner bark of torote stems. The torote is split using the teeth. The coil method is used, with the construction so tight in a number of works that they can hold water. Traditionally it has been women's work, but the demand for authentic caritas has brought men into their making as well. Traditional pieces such as containers and cradles are still made along with newer works for the tourist trade, such as shallow bowls with a wide variety of decorative motifs from the Seri religion and culture. Some stories suggest that these baskets have magical properties or contain something of the spirit of the women who made them. A commonly used decorative color is a rust-red, made from the root bark of the krameria plants, most often white rhatany. Recently commercial dye has been used. While the Seri probably decorated their baskets well into the past, the wide array of designs is more modern, probably because of the sale of the items to foreigners. The craft has declined because of the introduction of modern plastic, metal, etc. containers, but continues because of tourism to Seri areas, but not as much as the carving as the process is more labor-intensive.

Other northern basket traditions include that of the Pimas in Sonora, who weave petates and palm frond hats, along with spiral baskets. In Baja California, the Cochimies and Pai-pai weave palm fronds, cedar leaves and willow branches, using the spiral method to make baskets. The Tarahumara in Chihuahua work with palm fronds, reeds and pine needles. Many of there baskets are of a small size, similar to the pre-Hispanic tenates. Those of pine needles keep their distinctive odor for some time. Baskets for carrying water, called guares, have doubled walls. The Huichols in Durango, Nayarit and Jalisco make hats and small box containers with palm fronds. The boxes are similar to tenates, but with a rectangular prism like shape. Traditionally these have been used to store arrows.

=== Gulf of Mexico/Southeast ===
The Gulf of Mexico and Southeast extend the length of the state of Veracruz and into the Yucatán Peninsula and Chiapas. Basketry is made all over the state of Veracruz, with each ethnic and regional group producing its own style, based on their needs and other factors. Over time a number of traditional utilitarian and ceremonial items has been converted into decorative ones, and still support a number of Veracruz families. The Totonac principally use reeds, (A. donax) among others.) In the south of Veracruz, the Nahua communities of Pajapán and Hueyapan de Ocampo produce elaborate baskets with wicker and the roots of the Philodendrum radiatum and Monstera deliciosa. In the center of the state, mestizo groups create various products such as the palm petates in Tigrillos and shrimp traps in Jalcomulco located in the center of Veracruz on the eastern side of the Cofre de Perote. It is surrounded by semi deciduous rainforest with over 800 species of plants, as well a fruit orchards and fields with sugar cane and other crops. Its basketry is mostly linked to the harvesting of crayfish and fresh water shrimp form the Los Pescados River, using basket-like traps traditionally made from reeds. Since the 1990s, the economy has changed from agriculture and fishing towards eco-tourism. This had led to many trap makers to expand their skills into other objects such decorative baskets, vases, fruit bowls, lamp bases and more. The demand for these products has taken a toll on the plants used for this purpose.

In Chiapas, palm fronds are often used, along with ixtle, which is most commonly used by the Lacandons to makes bags and nets. In Tabasco palm fronds are used to make petates and various types of fans. In Campeche and part of the state of Yucatán they make very fine hats from a specific species of palm, locally called jipi-japa. This work is often done in caves to keep the fibers moist and flexible while they are worked. Communities best known for this work include Ticul, Yucatán and Becal, Campeche. Palm frond baskets are made all over the Yucatán peninsula, often dyed, using the coil method. Most of these baskets are made by women, with the best known community for this activity being Halachó.
