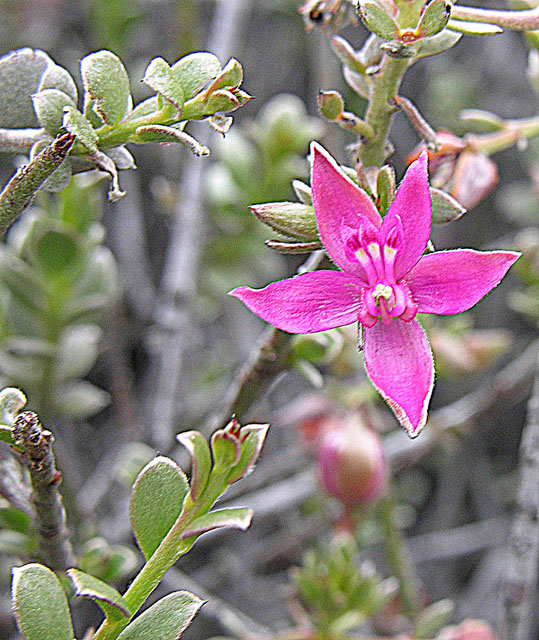

Scientific classification
- Kingdom: Plantae
- Clade: Tracheophytes
- Clade: Angiosperms
- Clade: Eudicots
- Clade: Rosids
- Order: Zygophyllales
- Family: Krameriaceae
- Genus: Krameria
- Species: K. cistoidea

Binomial name
- Krameria cistoidea Hook. & Arn.

= Krameria cistoidea =

Species of shrub

Krameria cistoidea is a perennial shrub in the flowering plant family Krameriaceae. It is endemic to northern and central Chile.

The biological action of genus members is caused by the astringent rhataniatannic acid, which is similar to tannic acid. Members of Krameria are found across the Americas, with most native to the tropical regions.

An example occurrence of this species is in the Cerro La Campana of central Chile, where it is found in association with the Chilean Wine Palm, Jubaea chilensis.

They are perennial shrubs which act as root parasites on other plants. The flowers have glands called elaiophores which produce a lipid which is collected by bees of the genus Centris as they pollinate the flowers.
