= Krameria ixine =

Scientific classification
- Kingdom: Plantae
- Clade: Tracheophytes
- Clade: Angiosperms
- Clade: Eudicots
- Clade: Rosids
- Order: Zygophyllales
- Family: Krameriaceae
- Genus: Krameria
- Species: K. ixine

Binomial name
- Krameria ixine L.

Species of shrub

Krameria ixine (abrojo colorado) is a perennial shrub of the family Krameriaceae, the Rhatanies. It is native to Puerto Rico, Haiti, Netherlands Antilles, Antigua and Barbuda, Grenada, Saint Kitts and Nevis, Central America, and in South America (Guyana, Venezuela, and Colombia).
