= Purpuric agave dermatitis =

- Specialty: Dermatitis

Purpuric agave dermatitis is a skin condition caused by Agave americana, a large, thick, long-leaved, subtropical plant.

== See also ==
- Skin lesion
