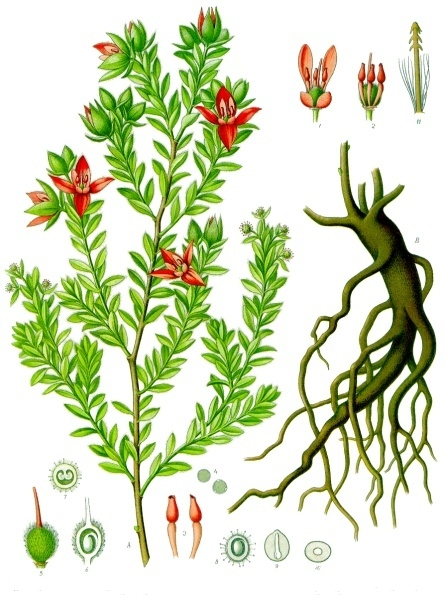
- K. lappacea

Scientific classification
- Kingdom: Plantae
- Clade: Tracheophytes
- Clade: Angiosperms
- Clade: Eudicots
- Clade: Rosids
- Order: Zygophyllales
- Family: Krameriaceae; Dumort.
- Genus: Krameria; Loefl.

Species
- 17; see text

Synonyms
- Krameria Loefl., not validly publ.; Landia Dombey; Dimenops Raf.; Ixina Raf.; Stemeiena Raf.

= Krameria =

Genus of flowering plants

Krameria is the only genus in the family Krameriaceae, of which any of the approximately 17–18 species. The genus is named after the Austrian botanist Johann Georg Heinrich Kramer (1684-1744).

The species are commonly known as rhatany, ratany or rattany. Rhatany is also the name given to krameria root, a botanical remedy consisting of the dried root of para rhatany (Krameria argentea) or Peruvian rhatany (Krameria lappacea).

The biological action of rhatany is caused by the astringent rhataniatannic acid, which is similar to tannic acid. Infusions have been used as a gargle, a lozenge, especially when mixed with cocaine, as a local hemostatic and remedy for diarrhea. When finely powdered, the dried roots furnished a frequent constituent of tooth powders. The powdered roots have also served, especially in Portugal, to color wines ruby red. The root bark contains an almost insoluble free red substance called ratanhia red.

== Ecology ==
Krameria are found across the Americas where they grow in habitats ranging from arid deserts to subtropical savannas. They are perennial hemiparasitic shrubs that simultaneously photosynthesize and collect nutrients from the root systems of other plants. They have parasitic organs called haustoria which puncture foreign roots, forming a bulbous-shaped nutrient pathway between the two organisms. The flowers have two specialized fleshy petals called elaiophores that produce a lipid which is collected by bees of the genus Centris as they pollinate the flowers. This is an obligate pollination relationship, and Krameriaceae is one of eleven extant lineages of oil-flowers.

== Taxonomic history ==
Krameria was first collected by European botanists in the 1750s during an expedition in northern South America by Pehr Löfling. The new taxa was originally placed in Linnaeus' Tetrandria Monogynia, meaning flowers with four stamens and one pistil. Since its initial collection, there have been 17 new species of Krameria described, the most recent of which, Krameria bahiana, was in 1987.

Krameria exhibits a high degree of morphological divergence from other angiosperms. This divergence, exemplified by root parasitism and specialized pollination structures, is driven by coevolutionary relationships with insects and other plants. Due to its distinct morphology, Krameria was a "problem taxon" for taxonomists until the 21st century.

Previously allied with the Polygalaceae and the Fabaceae, genetic analyses in 1993 and 2000 showed that Krameriaceae is most closely related to Zygophyllaceae. This placement had never before been considered by taxonomists due to the morphological differences between the two families.

Within the family, there are two major clades, each with a North and South American subclade. This phylogeny suggests two distinct geographical radiation events between the Americas.

== Species ==
Currently, 17 species are accepted:

- Krameria argentea Mart. ex Spreng. – para rhatany
- Krameria bahiana B.B.Simpson
- Krameria bicolor S.Watson (=K. grayi) – white rhatany
- Krameria cistoidea Hook. & Arn.
- Krameria cytisoides Cav.
- Krameria erecta Willd. – Pima rhatany, purple heather, littleleaf rhatany
- Krameria grandiflora A.St.-Hil.
- Krameria ixine L. – abrojo Colorado
- Krameria lanceolata Torr. – trailing krameria
- Krameria lappacea (Dombey) Burdet & B.B.Simpson (=K. triandra, K. iluca) – Peruvian rhatany
- Krameria pauciflora DC.
- Krameria paucifolia Rose
- Krameria ramosissima S.Watson – manystem rhatany
- Krameria revoluta O.Berg
- Krameria secundiflora DC.
- Krameria spartiodes Klotzsch ex O.Berg
- Krameria tomentosa A.St.-Hil.
