= Miske (drink) =

Ecuadorian Distilled Alcoholic Beverage

Miske is an Ecuadorean distilled alcoholic beverage made from the sap of agave plants.

Miske is similar to Mexican mezcal, but is made from the sap, called chawarmishki in Ecuador (Quechua chawar "raw" + mishki "sweet", whence the name "miske"), rather than the cooked heart (piña), which is used in mezcal.

== History ==
Agave sap (chawarmishki, called aguamiel in Mexico) has been harvested for centuries by the indigenous people of Ecuador, specifically Agave americana (called maguey in Mexico). Among other uses, it has been spontaneously fermented using wild yeasts to make guarango (Quechua; Mexican pulque). Around 1970, people began to distill this, producing an agave liquor. This began to be commercialized in the 2010s, and the name "miske" was coined by Diego Mora, though some producers prefer the term "Andean agave". At the San Francisco World Spirits Competition 2021 competition, two miskes were awarded gold medals (Casa Agave Silver and Reposado). As of 2021, miske is not widely produced or consumed in Ecuador, but producers hope to imitate the success of tequila, making miske Ecuador's national drink, and popularizing it first in the United States, then in Ecuador. The brand Chawar is currently the only Miske available in the United States.
