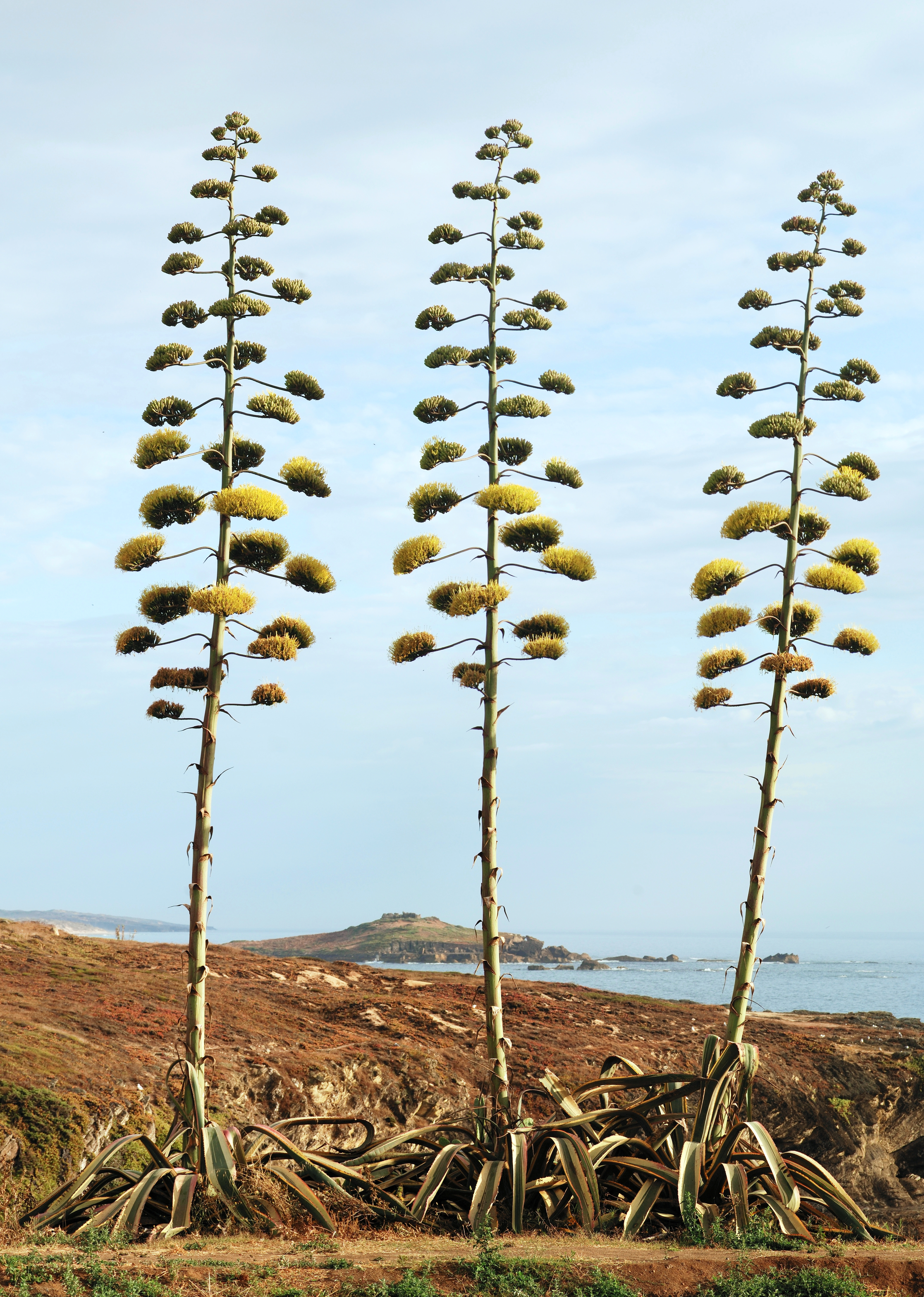
- The flower stalk may reach up to 8 m (26 ft) in height

Conservation status
- Least Concern (IUCN 3.1)

Scientific classification
- Kingdom: Plantae
- Clade: Tracheophytes
- Clade: Angiosperms
- Clade: Monocots
- Order: Asparagales
- Family: Asparagaceae
- Subfamily: Agavoideae
- Genus: Agave
- Species: A. americana

Binomial name
- Agave americana L.

Synonyms
- Synonyms list: Agave altissima Zumagl.; Agave communis Gaterau; Agave complicata Trel. ex Ochot.; Agave cordillerensis Lodé & Pino; Agave felina Trel.; Agave fuerstenbergii Jacobi; Agave gracilispina (Rol.-Goss.) Engelm. ex Trel.; Agave ingens A.Berger; Agave melliflua Trel.; Agave milleri Haw.; Agave ornata Jacobi; Agave picta Salm-Dyck; Agave ramosa Moench; Agave salmiana var. gracilispina Rol.-Goss; Agave subtilis Trel.; Agave subzonata Trel.; Agave theometel Zuccagni; Agave variegata Steud.; Agave virginica Mill. 1768, non L. 1753; Agave zonata Trel.

= Agave americana =

Species of flowering plant

Agave americana, commonly known as the century plant, maguey, or American aloe, is a flowering plant species belonging to the family Asparagaceae. It is native to Mexico and the United States. This plant is widely cultivated worldwide for its ornamental value and has become naturalized in various regions, including Southern California, the West Indies, South America, the Mediterranean Basin, Africa, the Canary Islands, India, China, Thailand, New Zealand and Australia.

Despite being called "American aloe" in common parlance, Agave americana is not closely related to Aloe species.

== Description ==
The common name "century plant" stems from its monocarpic nature of flowering only once at the end of its long life. After flowering, the plant dies but produces adventitious shoots from the base, allowing its growth to continue. Although it is called the century plant, it typically lives only 10 to 30 years. It has a spread around 1.8–3.0 m (6–10 ft) with gray-green leaves measuring 0.9–1.5 m (3–5 ft) in length, each with a prickly margin and a heavy spike at the tip that can pierce deeply. Towards the end of its life, the plant produces a tall, branched stalk adorned with yellow blossoms, which can reach a height of 8–9 m (25–30 ft).

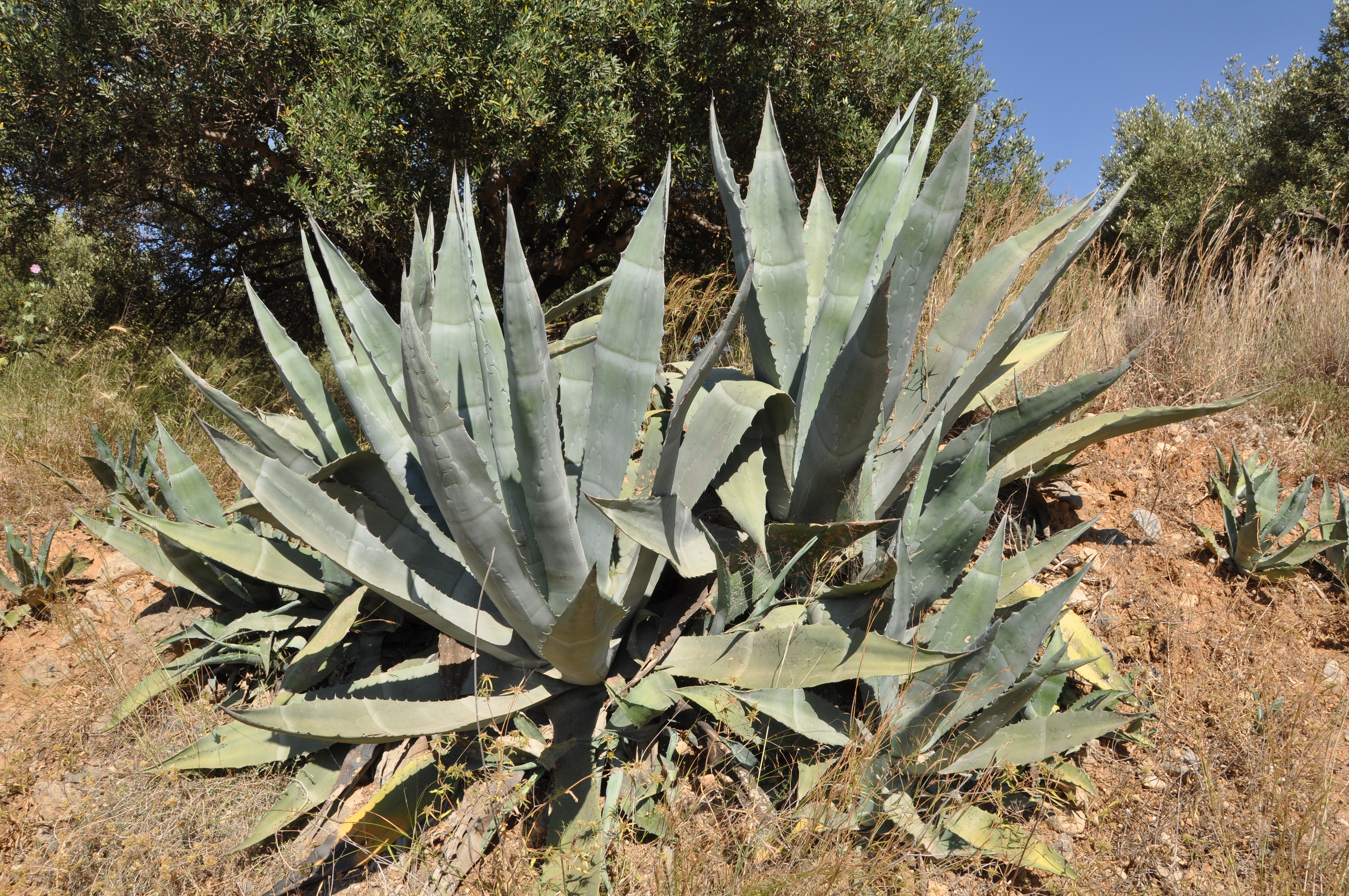
On the Mediterranean island of Crete, Greece

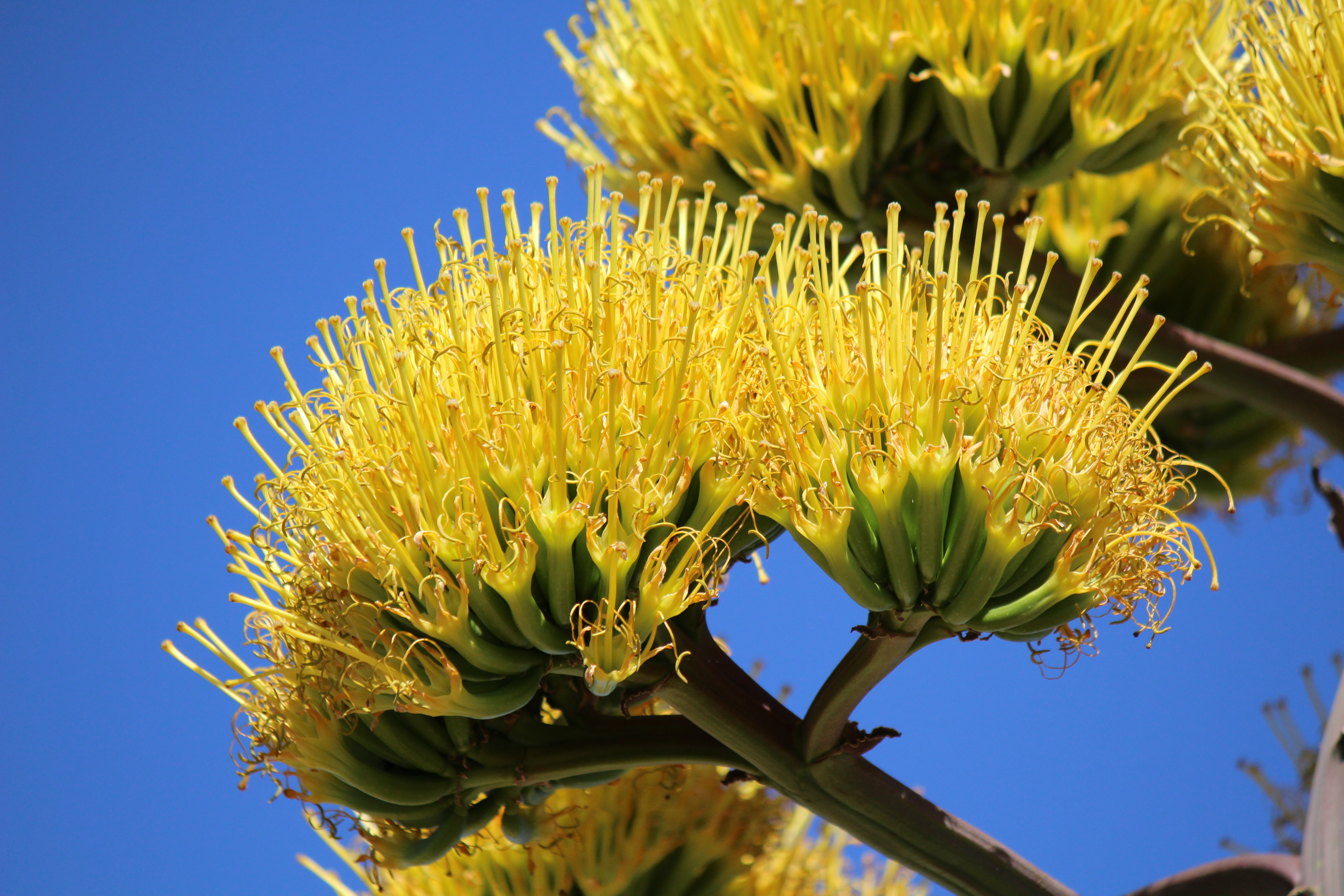
Blossoms

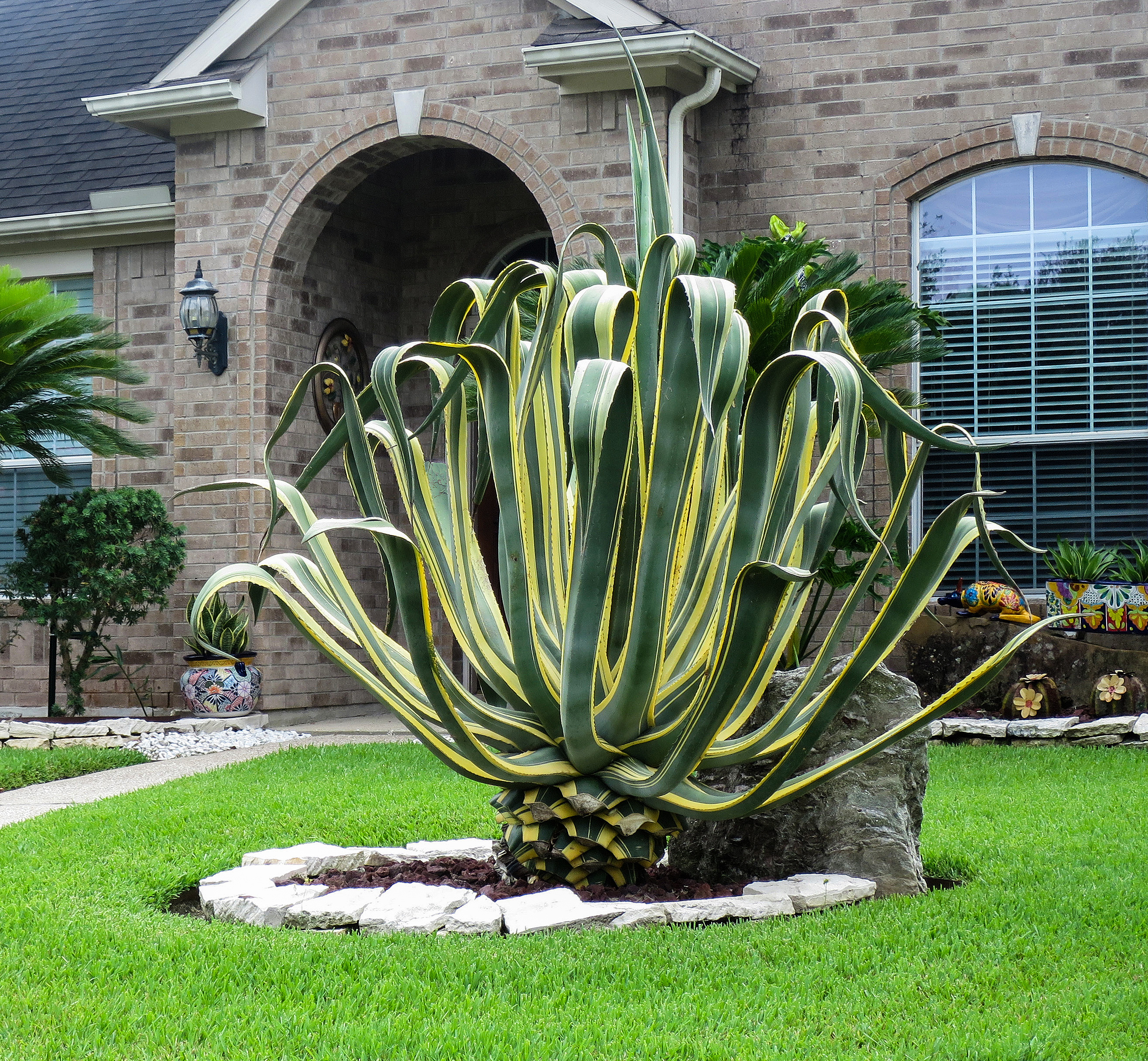
'Marginata', a variegated cultivar

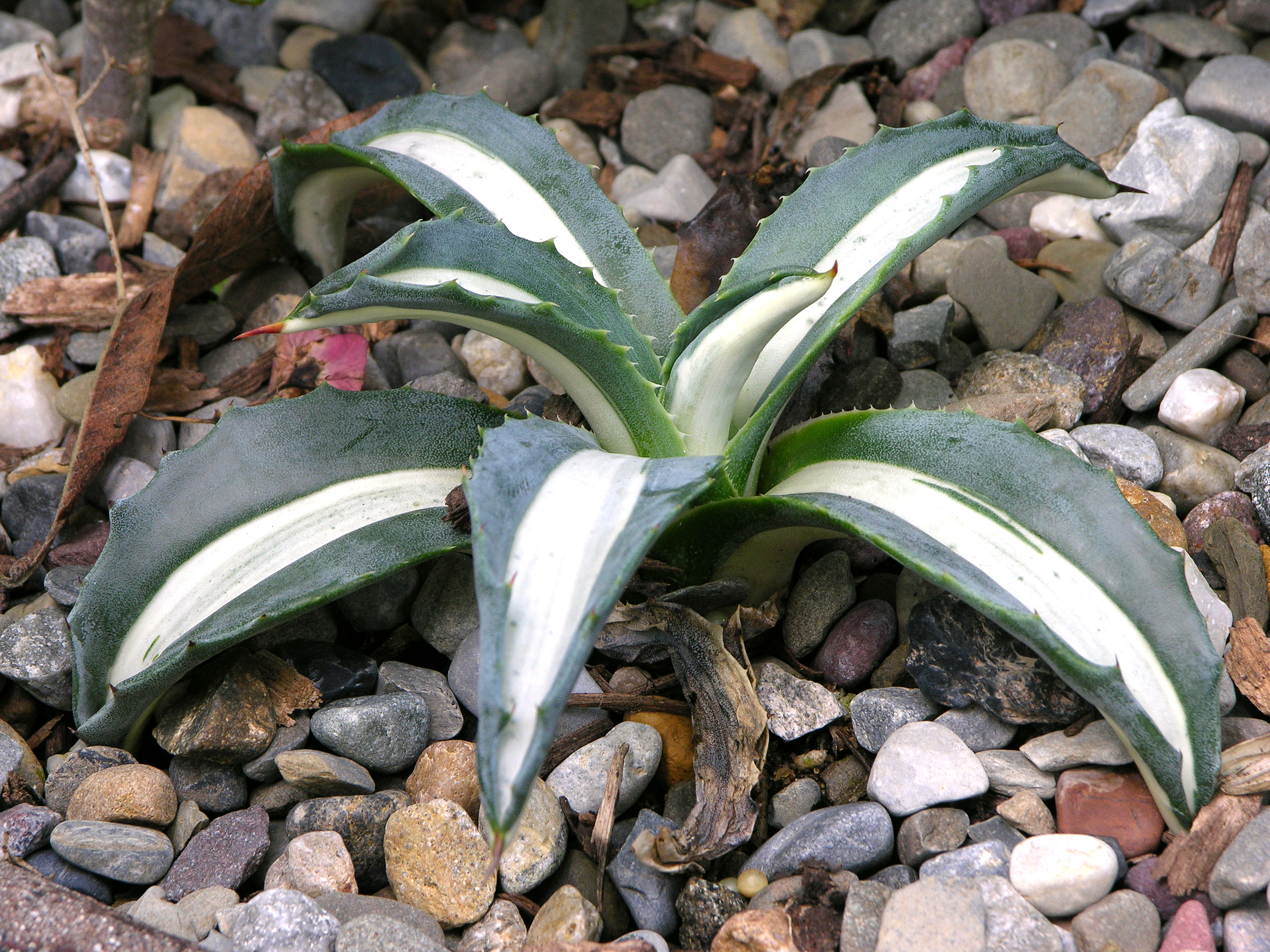
Cultivar 'Mediopicta'

== Naming ==
The species was given its binomial name Agave americana by Carl Linnaeus in the first edition of Species Plantarum (1753). This name is the one still in use today.

== Cultivation ==
A. americana is cultivated as an ornamental plant, particularly valued for its large, dramatic mature form. It is often found in modernist, xeriscapes (drought-tolerant), and desert-style cactus gardens. It is popularly used in hot climates and areas prone to drought. The plant's presence can evoke the ambiance of 18th- to 19th-century Spanish colonial and Mexican provincial areas in the Southwestern United States, California, and xeric regions of Mexico. In dry beach gardens in Florida and coastal areas of the Southeastern United States, it is a favored choice for landscaping.

When grown as a houseplant, A. americana is tolerant of light levels ranging from direct sunlight to shade, and requires minimal watering. It undergoes a winter resting period at temperatures around 10 to 12 °C (50 to 54 °F). It thrives in a highly porous, sandy potting soil, should be allowed to dry out between waterings, and should be repotted annually in the spring.

=== Subspecies and varieties ===
The World Checklist of Selected Plant Families recognizes two subspecies and two varieties of A. americana. Additionally, there are several cultivars, including 'Marginata,' 'Mediopicta,' 'Mediopicta Alba,' 'Mediopicta Aurea,' 'Striata,' and 'Variegata.' Some of these cultivars, along with the parent species, have received the Royal Horticultural Society's Award of Garden Merit.

Two subspecies and two varieties of A. americana are:

- A. americana subsp. americana
- A. americana subsp. protamericana Gentry
- A. americana var. expansa (Jacobi) Gentry
- A. americana var. oaxacensis Gentry
- A. americana var. marginata Trel.

Cultivars include:

- 'Marginata' agm with yellow stripes along the margins of each leaf
- 'Mediopicta' agm with a broad cream central stripe
- 'Mediopicta Alba' agm with a central white band
- 'Mediopicta Aurea' with a central yellow band
- 'Striata' with multiple yellow to white stripes along the leaves
- 'Variegata' agm with white edges on the leaves.

(those marked agm, as well as the parent species, have gained the Royal Horticultural Society's Award of Garden Merit).

== Uses ==
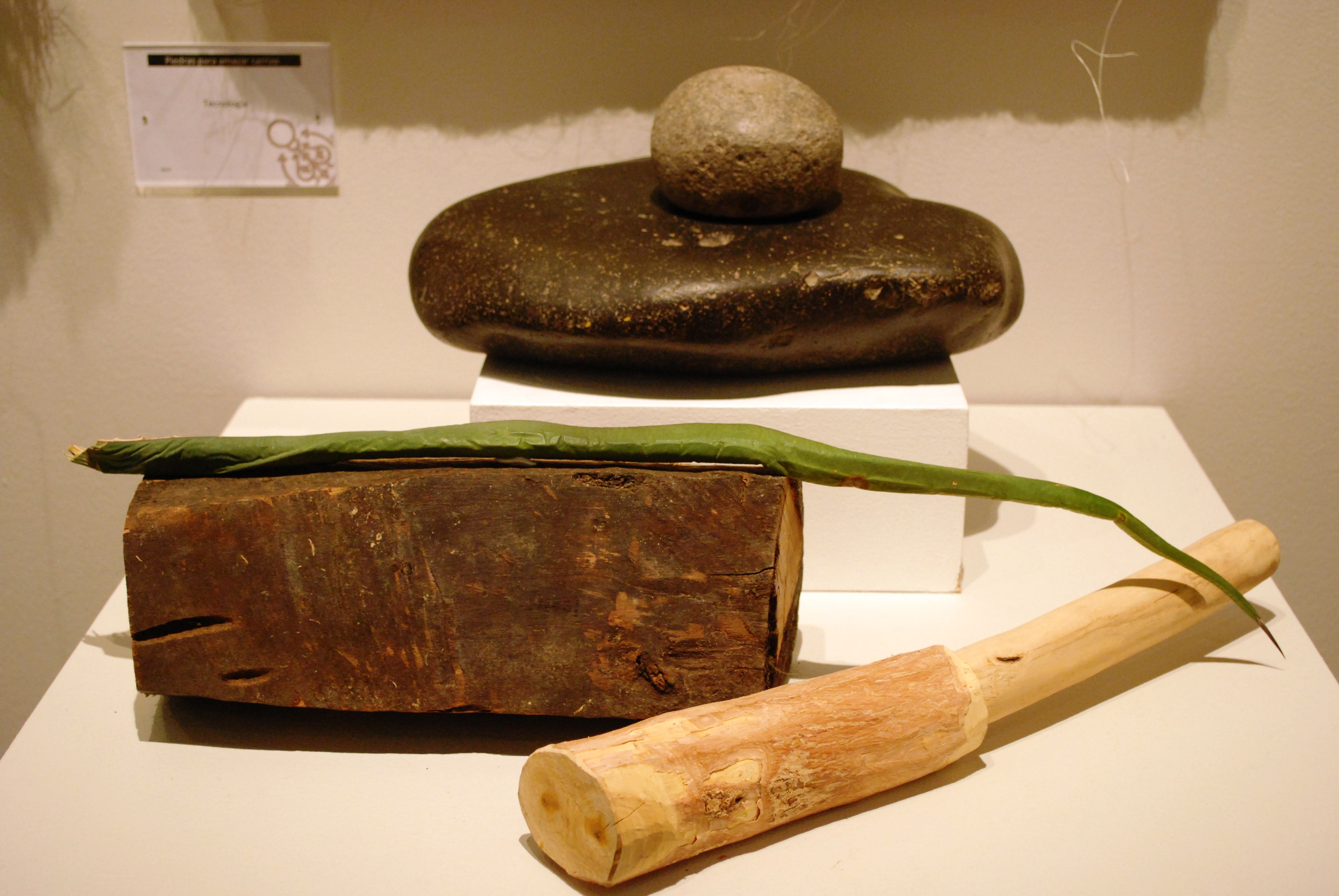
Tools used to obtain agave's ixtle fibers, at the Museo de Arte Popular, Mexico City, D.F.

=== Cuisine ===
Agave americana has various uses starting in pre-Columbian Mexico. If the flower stem is cut before flowering, a sweet liquid known as aguamiel ("lit. 'honey water') can be collected from the plant's hollowed heart. This liquid can be fermented to produce the alcoholic drink called pulque or octli used in pre-Columbian Mexico.

In the tequila-producing regions of Mexico, agaves are known as mezcales. Mezcal refers to the high-alcohol product obtained through fermented agave distillation, and A. americana is among the several Agave species used for this purpose. The specific mezcal known as tequila is produced from Agave tequilana, commonly referred to as "blue agave." Mezcal comes in various types, some of which may be flavored with the intensely pungent mezcal worm.

Mezcal and tequila, despite being produced from agave plants, differ from pulque in their sugar extraction techniques and classification as distilled spirits. In mezcal and tequila production, the sugars are obtained by heating the piñas (or hearts) of the plants in ovens, as opposed to collecting aguamiel from the cut stalk of the plant. Therefore, if pulque were to be distilled, it would not be classified as mezcal but rather as a distinct beverage.

Agaves are also found throughout Latin America and are used in similar ways. In Ecuador, the equivalent of pulque is known as guarango, which has recently been distilled as miske. Its use in making fermented and distilled drinks may have been a reason why settlers introduced the plant to Spanish Alta California, and according to reports made to ethnologist J. P. Harrington, Chumash consultants had seen a mission priest collect juice from the stalks, though the Chumash themselves did not produce alcoholic beverages.

Agave nectar is marketed as a natural sweetener with a low glycemic index, primarily due to its high fructose content.

=== Fibers ===
The leaves of A. americana yield fibers called pita, which are suitable for making ropes, nets, bags, sacks, matting, and coarse cloth. They are also used for leather embroidery in a technique known as piteado. Both pulque and maguey fiber played significant roles in the pre-Columbian economy of Mexico. In California, where the plant was introduced during Spanish colonization, the fibers began to be used by indigenous people like the Chumash to make string as an alternative to the shorter fibers of native Hesperoyucca whipplei; the fiber cordage was employed in making string, sewing shoes, and possibly for basketry handles.

=== Medicine ===
Agave americana contains agavasaponins and agavosides (fructans). It is used in traditional medicine to treat various ailments, and as a laxative, diuretic, and diaphoretic. In California, following its introduction, it was reported that despined leaves were split and made into a poultice for boils. However, a comprehensive review of research literature using systematic methods (scientific review) did not find sufficient data to support its effectiveness or safety. A. americana can cause severe allergic dermatitis.

=== Heraldry ===
The plant holds heraldic significance and is featured in the coat of arms of Don Diego de Mendoza, a Native American governor of the village of Ajacuba, Hidalgo.

=== Art ===
Additionally, the Aztecs used the pulped leaves of A. americana to create paper. The fragments known as the Humboldt fragments were made using this technique.

== See also ==
- Purpuric agave dermatitis
