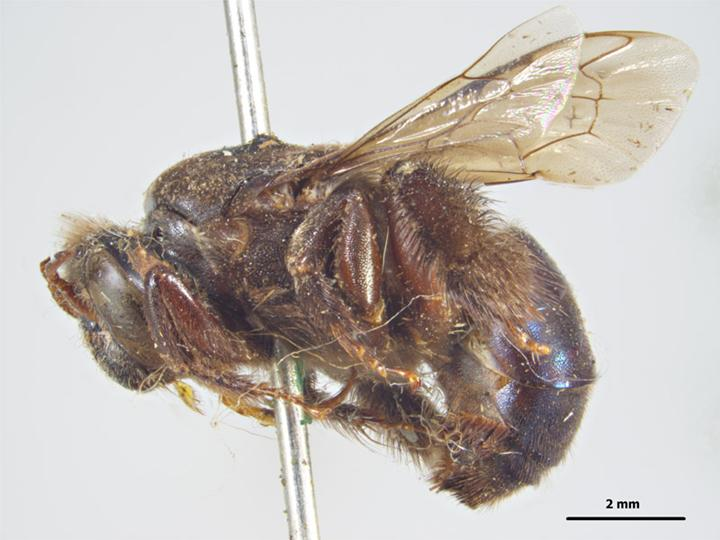
- Female

Scientific classification
- Kingdom: Animalia
- Phylum: Arthropoda
- Clade: Pancrustacea
- Class: Insecta
- Order: Hymenoptera
- Family: Apidae
- Genus: Ctenoplectra
- Species: C. australica

Binomial name
- Ctenoplectra australica Cockerell, 1926

= Ctenoplectra australica =

Species of bee

Ctenoplectra australica, is a species of bee in the family Apidae and subfamily Apinae. It is endemic to Australia. It was described by British-American entomologist Theodore Dru Alison Cockerell in 1926.

== Distribution and habitat ==
The species occurs in north-eastern Australia. The type locality is Claudie River, near Lockhart River in Far North Queensland.

== Behaviour ==
The adults are flying mellivores.
