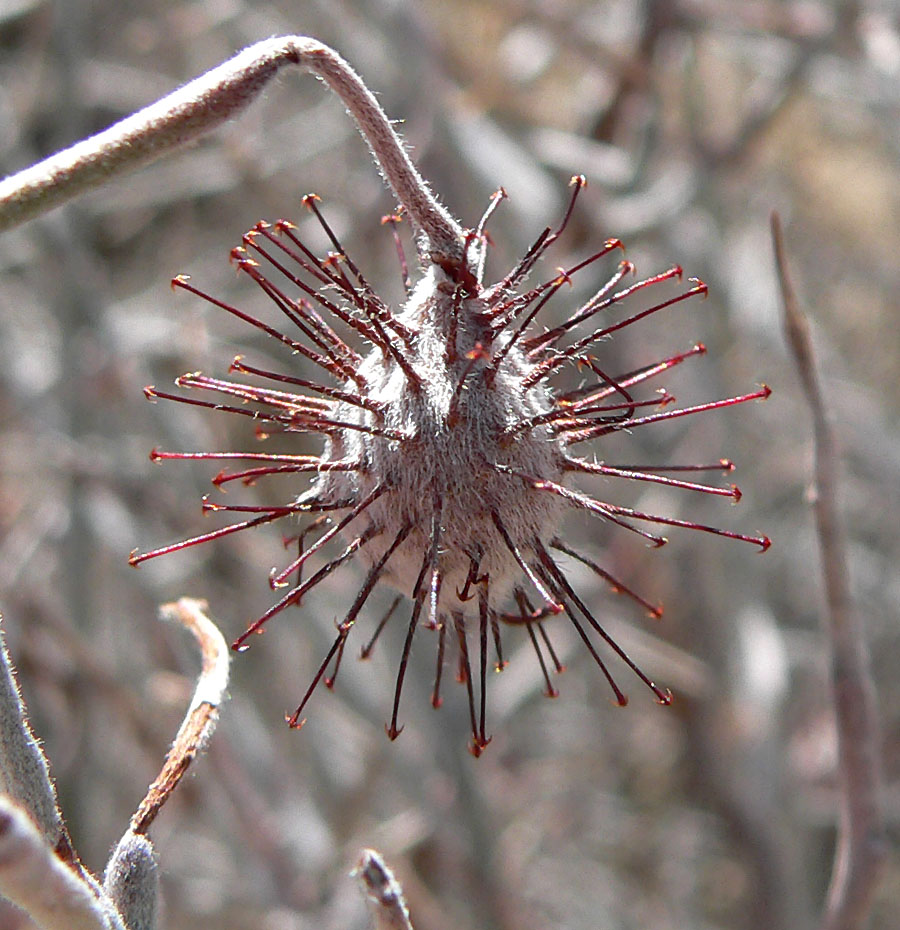
- barbed fruit

Scientific classification
- Kingdom: Plantae
- Clade: Tracheophytes
- Clade: Angiosperms
- Clade: Eudicots
- Clade: Rosids
- Order: Zygophyllales
- Family: Krameriaceae
- Genus: Krameria
- Species: K. bicolor

Binomial name
- Krameria bicolor S.Watson

Synonyms
- Krameria grayi Rose & Painter

= Krameria bicolor =

Species of shrub

Krameria bicolor is a perennial shrub or subshrub of the family Krameriaceae, the rhatanies. It is commonly known as white rhatany, crimson-beak, and chacate in Spanish (cosahui in the state of Sonora). It is found in drier environments of the southwestern United States from California to Texas, and in northern Mexico.

It is a low-lying, densely branched shrub, commonly up to 2 feet (1 m), but exceptionally to beyond 5.0 feet (2 m). The branches are spreading, with thornlike tips. The leaves are grey-green to greenish, finely-haired, narrow and only one-half to three-quarters of an inch long.

The color of the plant and branches is grayish-green to gray, or whitish-gray, to dull browns or tinged with red. The flowers are often sparse and sometimes inconspicuous, but plants in some locales can bloom prolifically in red flowers. The plant is used for dyes in the basketry of Seri people in Mexico.

The shrub is adapted to dry, desert environments, but it can take advantage of high soil moisture. The plant is partially parasitic, for example on creosote bush, Larrea tridentata.
