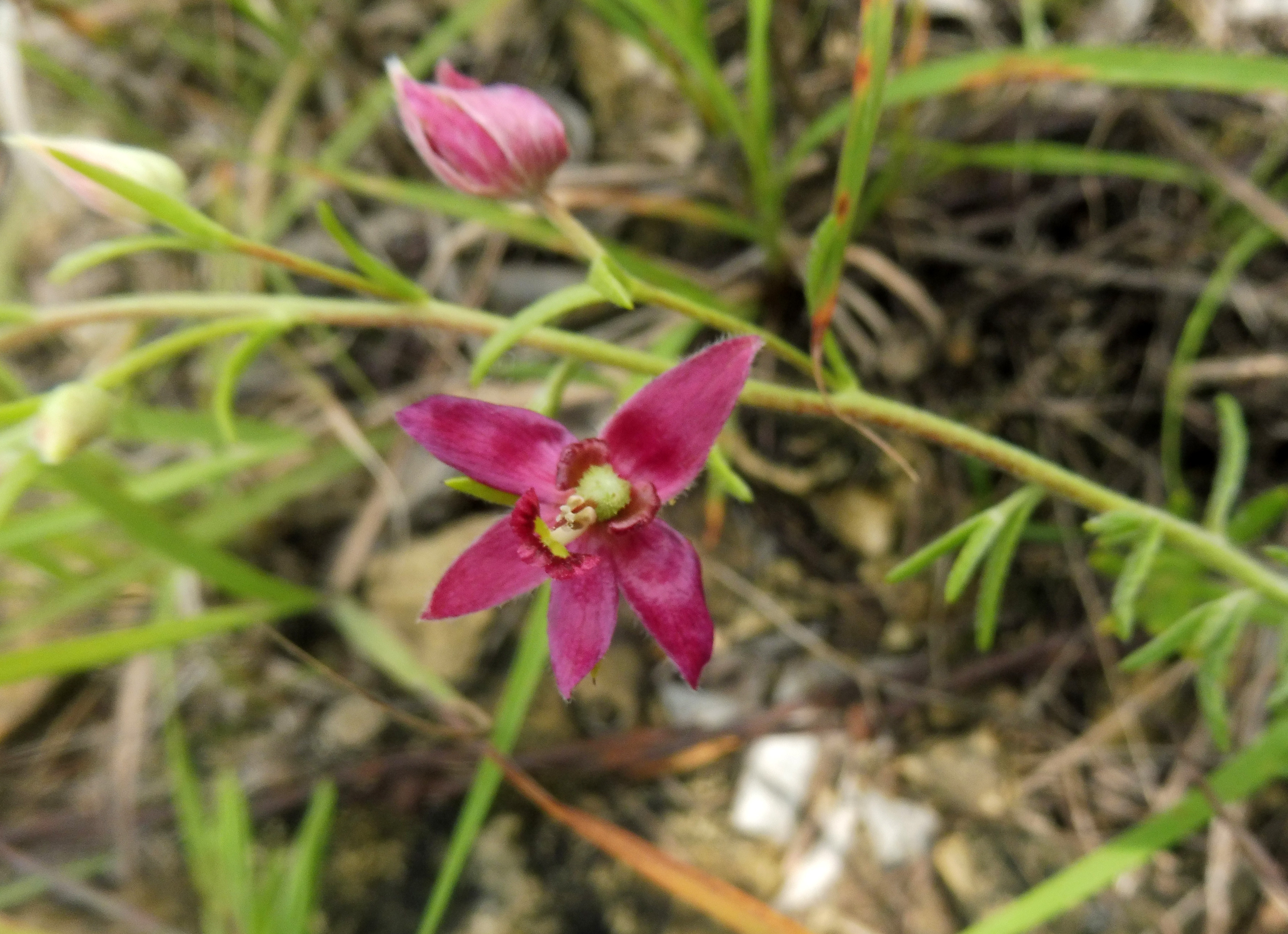

Conservation status
- Secure (NatureServe)

Scientific classification
- Kingdom: Plantae
- Clade: Tracheophytes
- Clade: Angiosperms
- Clade: Eudicots
- Clade: Rosids
- Order: Zygophyllales
- Family: Krameriaceae
- Genus: Krameria
- Species: K. lanceolata

Binomial name
- Krameria lanceolata Torr., 1827

Synonyms
- List: Krameria beyrichii Sporl. ex O.Berg (1856); Krameria secundiflora var. angustifolia Chodat (1890); Krameria secundiflora var. intermedia Chodat (1890); Krameria secundiflora var. lanceolata (Torr.) Chodat (1890); Krameria spathulata Small (1930); Dimenops lanceolata Raf. (1832)

= Krameria lanceolata =

Plant species in the rattany genus

Krameria lanceolata, commonly called trailing krameria, is a flowering plant in the rhatany family (Krameriaceae). It is native to North America, where it is found in the southwestern and south-central United States, and the states of Chihuahua and Coahuila in Mexico. It has populations disjunct eastward in the U.S. states of Florida and Georgia on the Coastal Plain. Its natural habitat is in sandy or rocky calcareous grasslands.

Krameria lanceolata is an herbaceous perennial that grows decumbent along the ground. It produces purple-red flowers in late spring through the summer.
