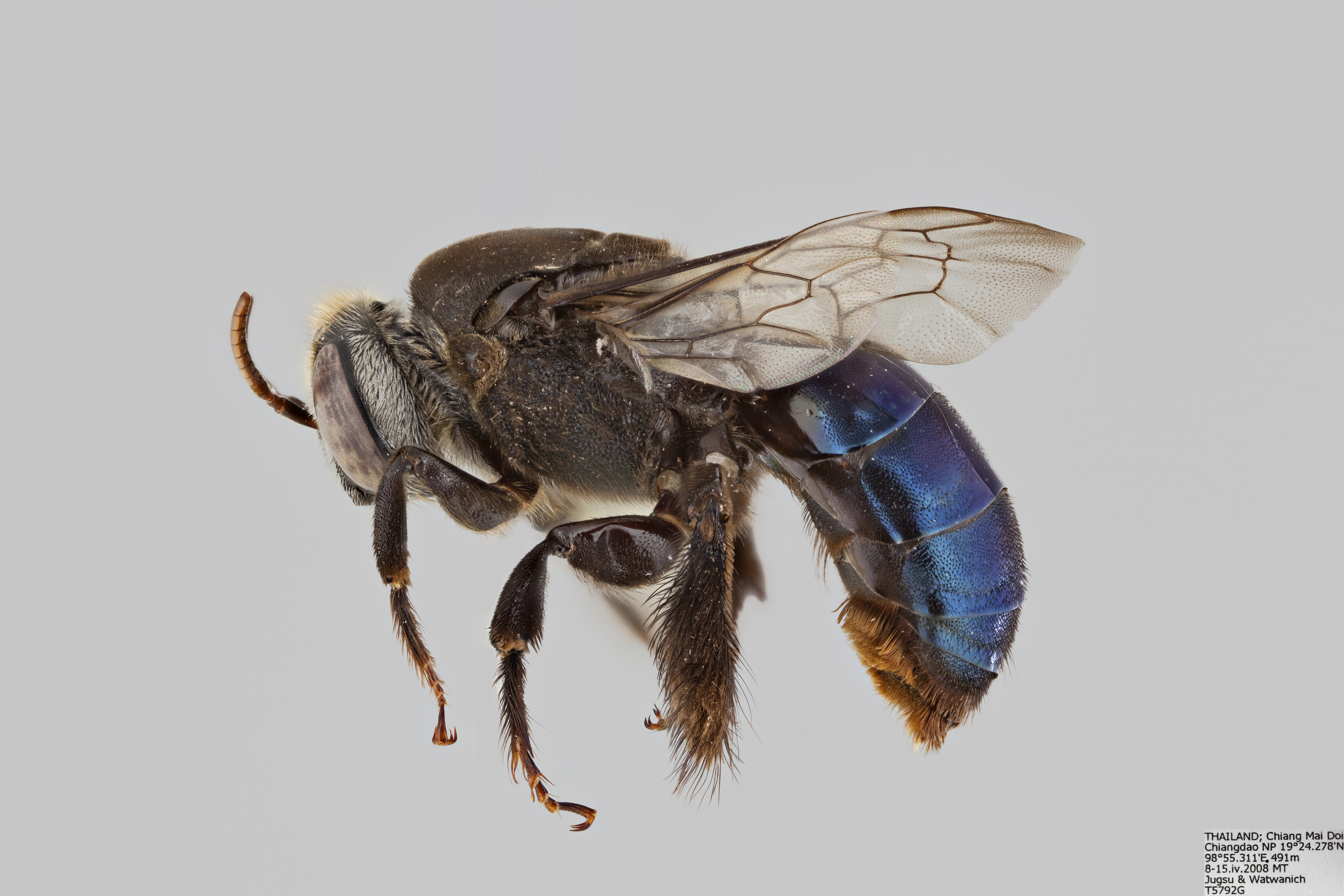
- Ctenoplectra sp.

Scientific classification
- Kingdom: Animalia
- Phylum: Arthropoda
- Clade: Pancrustacea
- Class: Insecta
- Order: Hymenoptera
- Family: Apidae
- Subfamily: Apinae
- Tribe: Ctenoplectrini

Genera
- Ctenoplectra; Ctenoplectrina

= Ctenoplectrini =

Tribe of bees

The bee tribe Ctenoplectrini of the subfamily Apinae, with the two genera Ctenoplectra and Ctenoplectrina, comprises 9 species in tropical Africa, 10 in Asia, and 1 in Australia.

== Description ==
The Ctenoplectrini are characterised by short tongues, modified scopae and large comb-like tibial spurs adapted to collect and carry a mixture of floral oils and pollen. The unusual morphology has made it difficult to infer their closest relatives, in turn preventing an understanding of these bees’ geographic and temporal origin and had led early authors to place them in their own family Ctenoplectridae. Recent molecular phylogenetic analyses find Ctenoplectrini to be monophyletic and closest to the long-horned bees, Eucerini.

Most of the tribe's species collect floral oil, pollen, and nectar from a few genera of the family Cucurbitaceae. However, three species are thought to be kleptoparasites.

== Kleptoparasitic species ==
The presumably kleptoparasitic species form a clade (Ctenoplectrina) that is sister to the remaining genus (Ctenoplectra), confirming the independent evolution of kleptoparasitism in this tribe.

Tree topology and molecular dating together suggest that Ctenoplectrini originated in Africa in the Early Eocene and that Ctenoplectra dispersed twice from Africa to Asia, sometime in the Late Eocene, 30–40 million years ago. From Asia one species reached the Australian continent via Indonesia and New Guinea in the mid-Miocene, circa 13 million years ago. Dry and cool mid-Miocene climates also coincide with the divergence between Ctenoplectra bequaerti from West Africa, and Ctenoplectra terminalis from East Africa and Southern Africa, perhaps related to fragmentation of the equatorial African rainforest belt.

Nests are known from few species only, which use existing small holes in wood and stone or old nests of other bees, which they provision with a mixture of pollen and floral oil, exclusively gathered from plants of a few genera of the family Cucurbitaceae.
