= Elaiophore =

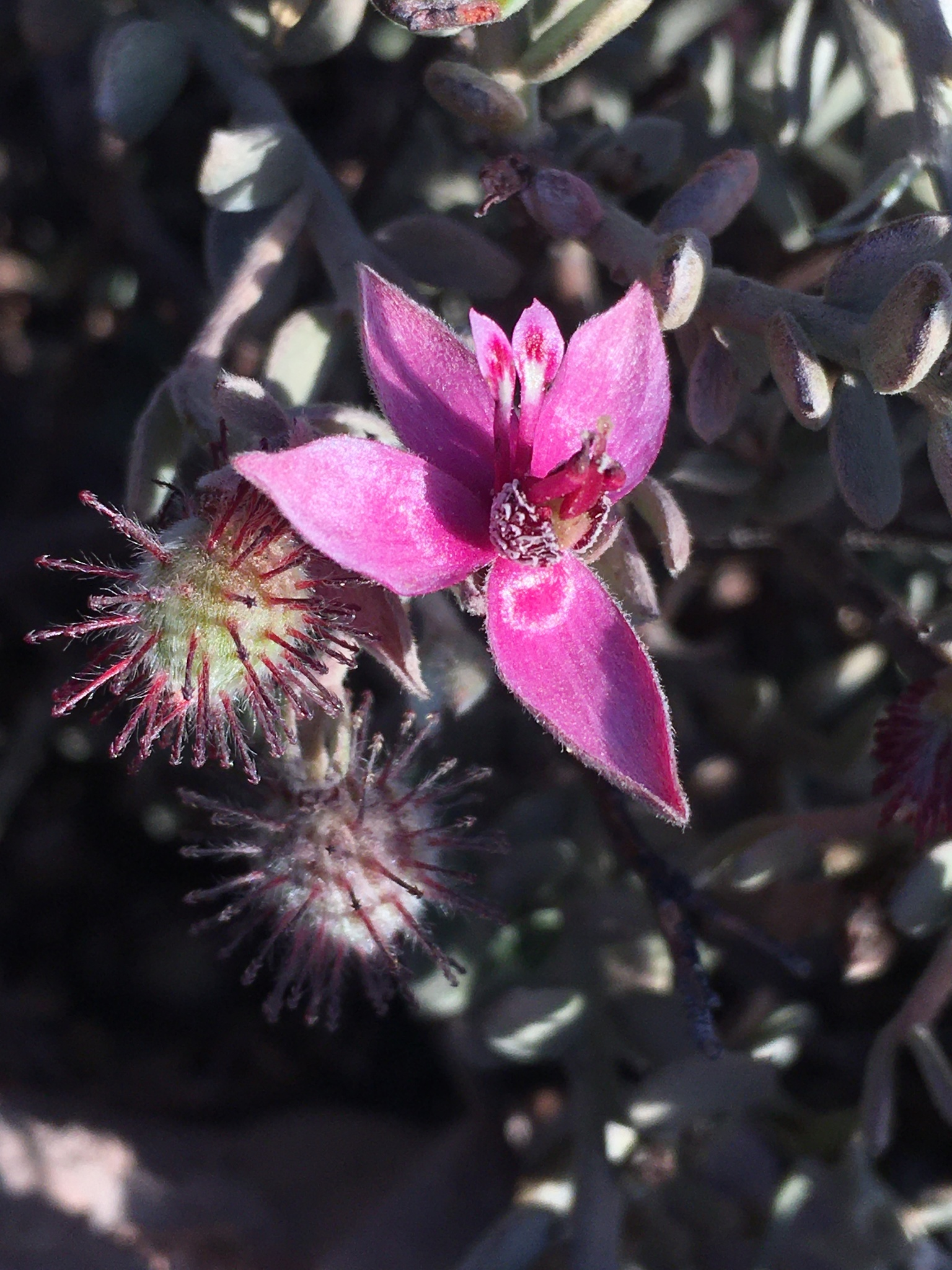
Krameria lappacea flower with elaiphores on the two short, pointed petals

An elaiophore (from Gr. elaion -oil and phorein -carry) is a plant organ that secretes oil.

A distinction is made in:

- epithelial elaiophores: oil glands
- trichome elaiophores: glandular hairs.

The oils consist of fatty acids and/or glycerides, but may also contain other components such as aldehydes, amino acids, carbohydrates, carotenoids, hydrocarbons, ketones, phenolic compounds, saponins and terpenes.

Elaiophores occur in the flowers of some families, such as Malpighiaceae, Scrophulariaceae, Iridaceae, Cucurbitaceae, Primulaceae and Solanaceae. Elaiophores can be present on the axial part of the sepals or corollas, on the surface of the lip, at the base of stamens (as in Lysimachia vulgaris) and also on the callus.

The oils secreted by the elaiophores act as attractants for pollinating insects. Representatives of several bee families collect these oils to add to the food of the larvae or to line the nest, including the families and subfamilies Melittidae, Ctenoplectrini, Apidae and Anthophorini. Bees of the subfamily Ctenoplectrini have specialized oil-collecting structures such as pads or combs on the ventral thorax or on the front and middle legs. Bees visiting flowers with trichome elaiophores generally have pads, and bees visiting flowers with epithelial elaiophores have brush-like combs.

== Sources ==
- Gerhard Wagenitz: Wörterbuch der Botanik. Morphologie, Anatomie, Taxonomie, Evolution. 2., erweiterte Auflage. Nikol, Hamburg 2008, ISBN 978-3-937872-94-0.
- Vogel, S. 1969. Flowers offering fatty oil instead of nectar. XI Proc. Intl. Bot. Congress, Seattle, p. 229. Abstr.
- Stephen L. Buchmann. 1987. The Ecology of Oil Flowers and their Bees. Annual Review of Ecology and Systematics, Vol. 18 pp. 343–369
- "Ölblumen bei der Universität Darmstadt" (in German). Archived from the original on 2007-06-12.
- Possobom, Clivia Carolina Fiorilo; Machado, Silvia Rodrigues (2017-05-15). "Elaiophores: their taxonomic distribution, morphology and functions". Acta Botanica Brasilica. 31 (3). FapUNIFESP (SciELO): 503–524. Bibcode:2017AcBBr..31..503P. doi:10.1590/0102-33062017abb0088. hdl:1843/47821. ISSN 1677-941X.
- Pacek-Bieniek A., Budowa i aktywność elajoforów w kwiatach wybranych gatunków z rodziny storczykowatych (Orchidaceae), Uniwersytet Przyrodniczy w Lublinie, 2011.
