= Piteado =

Mexican artisan technique

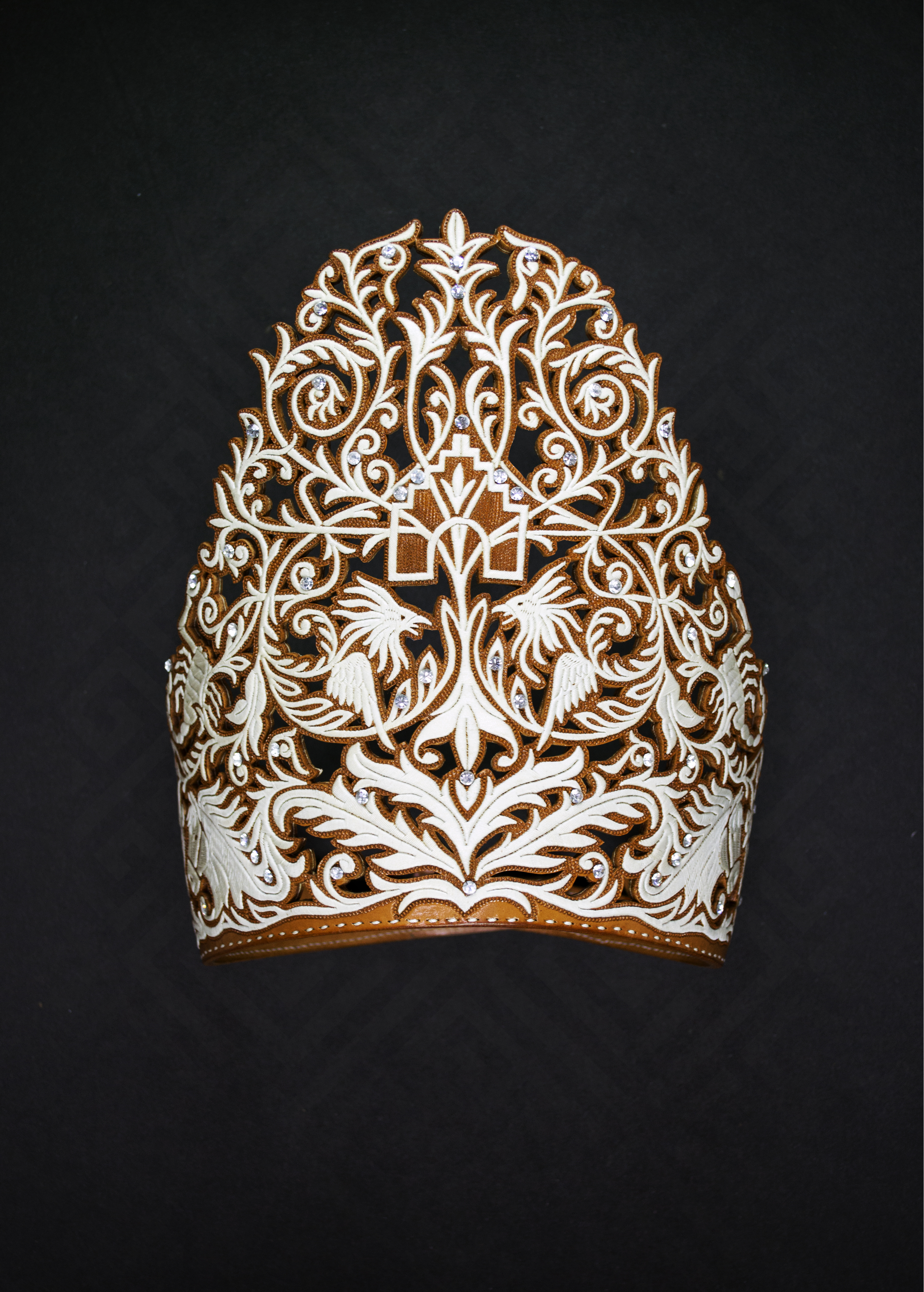
Crown made for the queen of the 25th National Fair Piteado (2016) in Colotlán

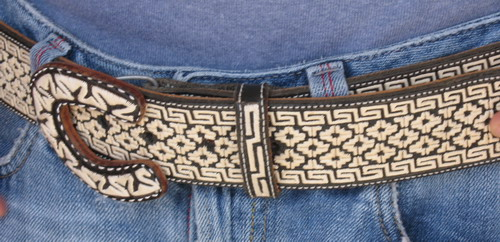
Detail of a hand made piteado belt

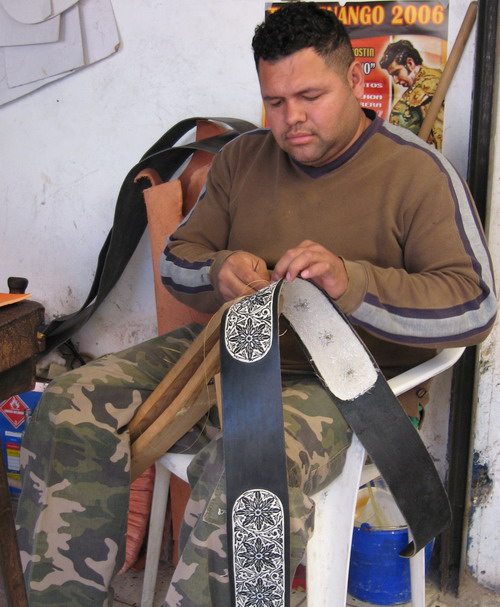
Punteador at work in talabartería

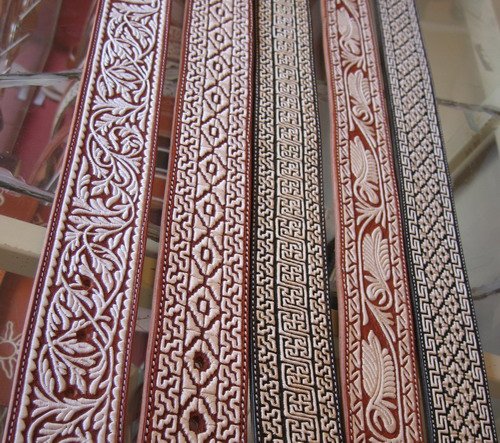
Variety of piteado belts

Piteado is an artisan technique where pita or ixtle (thread made from the fiber of the century plant) is embroidered onto leather in decorative patterns. The technique is used to make belts, sandals, hair bands, saddles, and other leather accessories. The technique is popular in Mexico and Central America, and typical designs include flowers, animals, charreada, and Pre-Hispanic symbols.

The piteado work is a traditional art craft made by hand used in some Mexican Folklore, and has spread to several communities in other Mexican states, including Hidalgo, Guerrero, Veracruz, San Luis Potosi, State of Mexico, Durango, Zacatecas, Guerrero, Michoacán, and Chiapas.

Colotlán is a town in Jalisco, who calls itself 'The piteado global capital, because their many saddlers shops, and piteado dedicated craftsmen as a main source of income for its inhabitants. Each one of those piteado-workshop employs three types of workers, each dedicated to a specialized task: drawers, embroiderers, and punteadores. There is an annual fair in promotion of local piteado artisan's art.

Hand embroidering a belt requires about 48 hours of labor. The kind of agave thread used to embroider is produced in Veracruz, Chiapas, and Oaxaca. Artisans from those regions make well-finished and more elaborate piteado works, but because of the lack of advertising and promotion, it is often difficult for them to sell to their intended market.

The Mexican State of Jalisco, renowned for this type of handicraft, has become a big producer of two kinds of non-traditional piteado industry. One which uses automated manufacturing embroidery machines to make imitation piteado products and one where non-precious silvery and golden wires are inserted in leather works which are then fraudulently traded as genuine gold and silver.

There is a foundation which promotes piteado in Veracruz, with branches in Florida and Shanghai, which embraces, supports, and makes contributions of machinery and equipment to communities of artisans. This organization also encourages scientific research to improve the plant from which the cactus fiber is obtained, bringing together the communities involved. They connect farmers from northern Oaxaca with biochemical and agricultural researchers in the Guatemalan region of Mesaltenango, supporting the experimental designs of some new products, giving resources and support to those potential artisans with great innovative creations, and continuing to preserve these natural non-renewable resources. The group encourages the improvement of the process of manufacturing some traditional products already on the market, the continued propagation of the art form, and the preservation of the history behind it.
