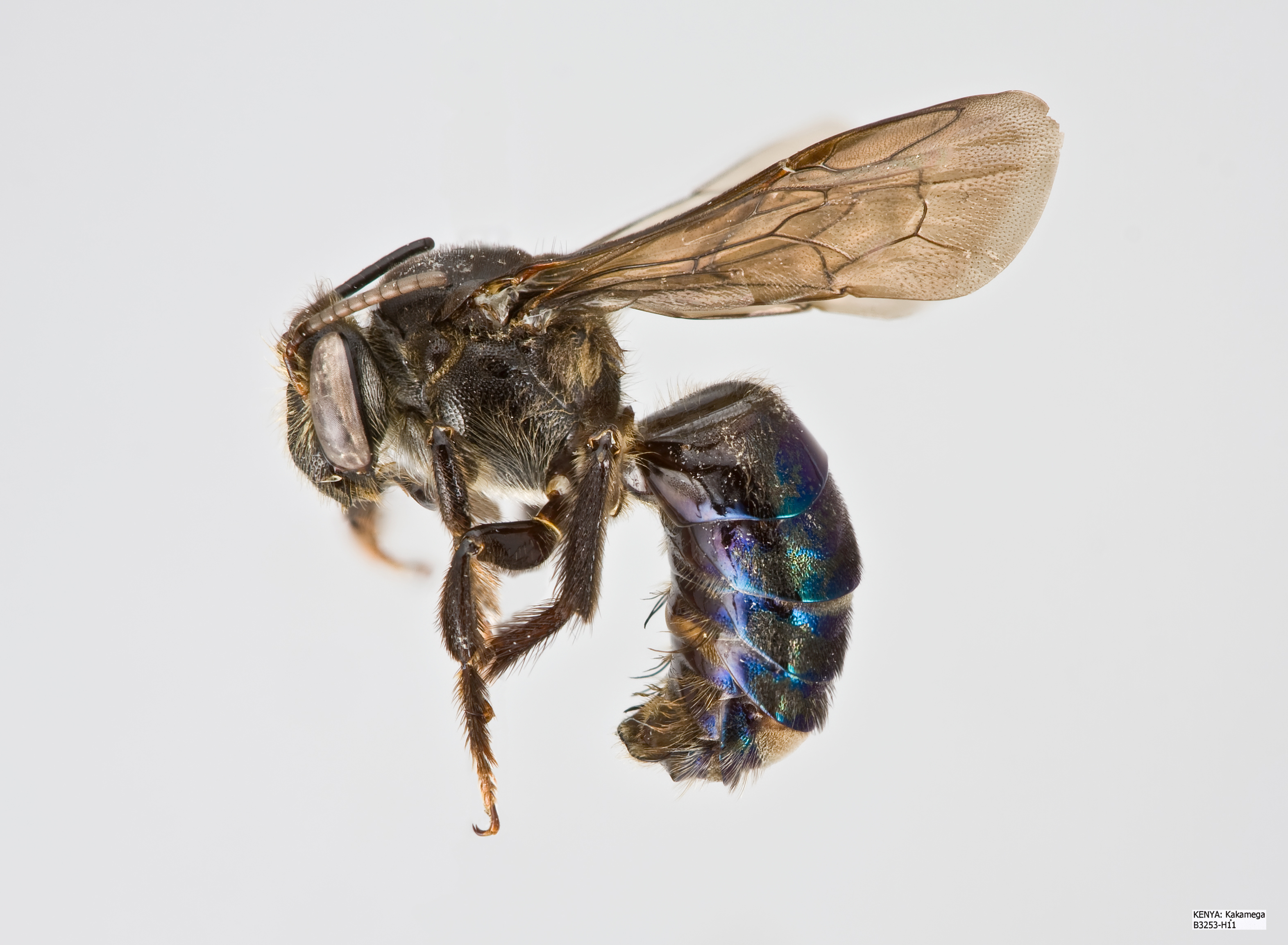
- Ctenoplectra terminalis

Scientific classification
- Kingdom: Animalia
- Phylum: Arthropoda
- Clade: Pancrustacea
- Class: Insecta
- Order: Hymenoptera
- Family: Apidae
- Genus: Ctenoplectra; Kirby, 1826

= Ctenoplectra =

Genus of bees

Ctenoplectra is a genus of bees belonging to the family Apidae. They occur in Africa and Malesia, with one species in Australia.

Species:

- Ctenoplectra albolimbata Magretti, 1895
- Ctenoplectra alluaudi Vachal, 1903
- Ctenoplectra antinorii Gribodo, 1884
- Ctenoplectra armata Magretti, 1895
- Ctenoplectra australica Cockerell, 1926
- Ctenoplectra bequaerti Cockerell, 1930
- Ctenoplectra chalybea Smith, 1857
- Ctenoplectra cornuta Gribodo, 1892
- Ctenoplectra davidi Vachal, 1903
- Ctenoplectra elsei Engel, 2007
- Ctenoplectra florisomnis Vecht, 1941
- Ctenoplectra paolii Guiglia, 1928
- Ctenoplectra polita (Strand, 1912)
- Ctenoplectra politula Cockerell, 1930
- Ctenoplectra sandakana Sung, 2009
- Ctenoplectra terminalis Smith, 1879
- Ctenoplectra thladianthae Vecht, 1941
- Ctenoplectra ugandica (Cockerell, 1945)
- Ctenoplectra vagans Cockerell, 1904
- Ctenoplectra yoshikawai Hirashima, 1962
