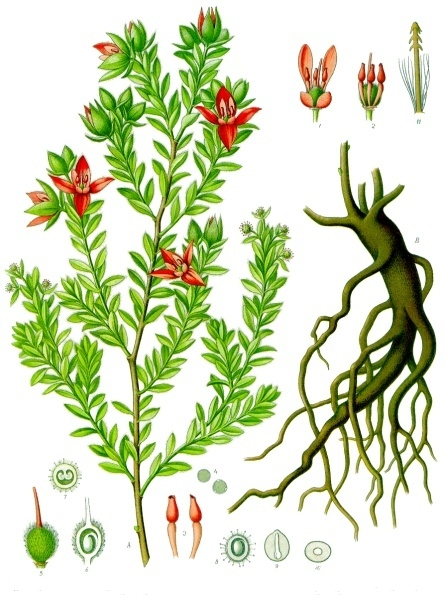

Scientific classification
- Kingdom: Plantae
- Clade: Tracheophytes
- Clade: Angiosperms
- Clade: Eudicots
- Clade: Rosids
- Order: Zygophyllales
- Family: Krameriaceae
- Genus: Krameria
- Species: K. lappacea

Binomial name
- Krameria lappacea (Dombey) Burdet & B.B.Simpson

Synonyms
- Krameria canescens Willd. ex Schult.; K. linearis Poir.; K. pentapetala Ruiz & Pav.; K. triandra Ruiz & Pav.; K. t. var. humboldtiana Chodat; Landia lappacea Dombey Vitman

= Krameria lappacea =

Species of plant

Krameria lappacea, commonly known as para rhatany and Peruvian rhatany, is a plant species in the genus Krameria, native to Ecuador, Peru, Bolivia, northern Chile and northwest Argentina. It is a slow-growing shrub that grows in semi-arid areas of the Andean region. The Latin specific epithet of lappacea is derived from lappa meaning with burrs.
