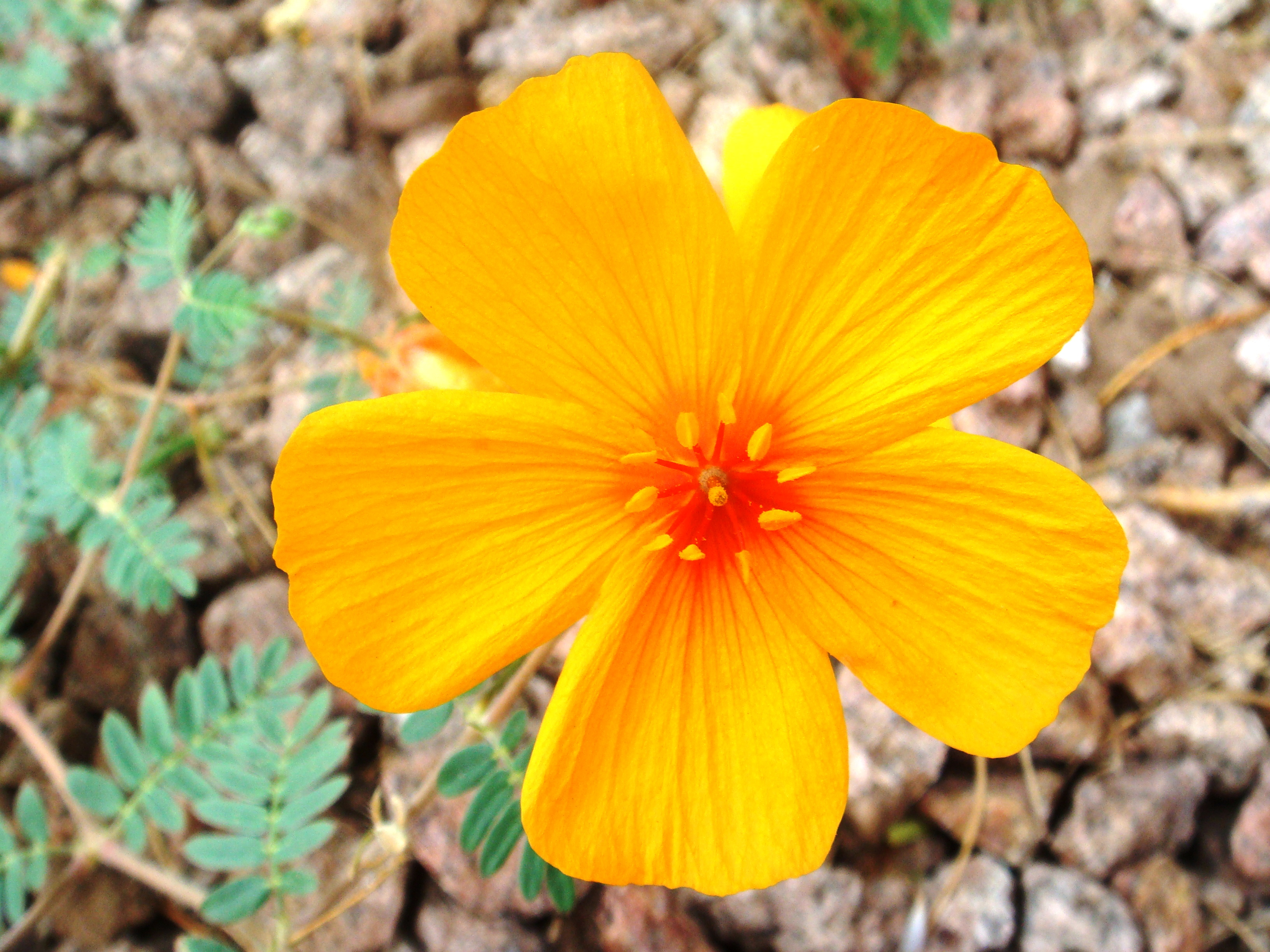
- Kallstroemia grandiflora

Scientific classification
- Kingdom: Plantae
- Clade: Tracheophytes
- Clade: Angiosperms
- Clade: Eudicots
- Clade: Rosids
- Order: Zygophyllales
- Family: Zygophyllaceae
- Subfamily: Tribuloideae (Reichenbach) D.H.Porter

Type genus
- Tribulus L.

Genera
- Balanites; Kallstroemia; Kelleronia; Neoluederitzia; Sisyndite; Tribulopis; Tribulus

= Tribuloideae =

Subfamily of flowering plants

Tribuloideae is a subfamily of the flowering plant family Zygophyllaceae.

== Genera ==
- Balanites Delile
- Kallstroemia Scop.
- Kelleronia Schinz
- Neoluederitzia Schinz
- Sisyndite E.Mey. ex Sond.
- Tribulopis R.Br.
- Tribulus L.
