= Balanites glabra =

Conservation status
- Least Concern (IUCN 3.1)

Scientific classification
- Kingdom: Plantae
- Clade: Embryophytes
- Clade: Tracheophytes
- Clade: Angiosperms
- Clade: Eudicots
- Clade: Rosids
- Order: Zygophyllales
- Family: Zygophyllaceae
- Genus: Balanites
- Species: B. glabra

Binomial name
- Balanites glabra Mildbr. & Schltr.

Species of tree

Balanites glabra is a species of tree or shrub in the family Zygophyllaceae. This tree is native to Ethiopia, Kenya, Somalia, and Tanzania.

== Description ==
Balanites glabra is a spiny shrub or tree growing to a maximum height of 9 metres (30 ft). The bark is grey or greyish green and is rough, cork-like and fissured on the trunk but greener and smoother on the branches, the spines and young shoots are green and glabrous, becoming greyer and hairier by their second year. The leaves are teardrop shaped with the stalk attached to the tapering end (i.e. obovate.) Flowers are borne in clusters of 4, sometimes 5, on a pedicel and are yellowish green to white. The young fruit is round but becomes more ellipsoid as it ripens when it changes colour to yellow, orange or pale red. The fruit is mildly poisonous to humans and may cause fever, diarrhoea and stomach ache.

== Distribution ==
Balanites glabra occurs in eastern Africa in Somalia, Ethiopia, Kenya and northern Tanzania.

== Habitat ==
Balanites glabra occurs in deciduous bushland, wooded grassland and grassland with scattered trees between 700m and 19800m above sea level. It is usually found on loamy or clay soils, black cotton soils, infrequently on stony or sandy soils, or on lava. It can persist in degraded plant communities often occurring alongside Opuntia.

== Uses ==
The wood of Balanites glabra is used for carvings. The leaves are used as fodder while the spiny branches make it suitable for use as fencing, either as a live or dead fence. Despite being mildly poisonous the fruits are eaten.
