= Pintoa =

Pintoa may refer to:

- Pintoa (wasp), a genus of wasps in the family Trichogrammatidae
- Pintoa (plant), a genus of plants in the family Zygophyllaceae
