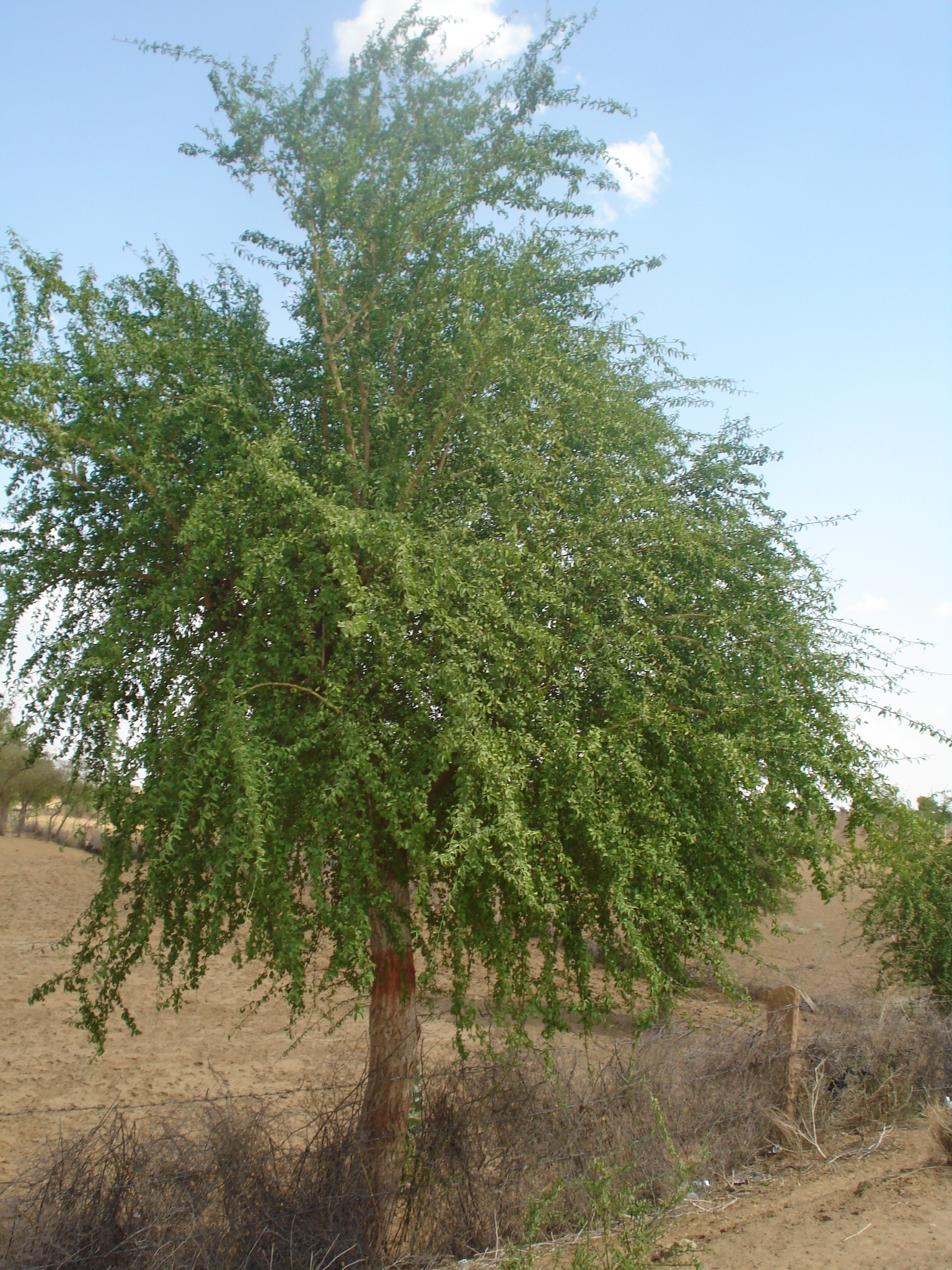

Scientific classification
- Kingdom: Plantae
- Clade: Embryophytes
- Clade: Tracheophytes
- Clade: Angiosperms
- Clade: Eudicots
- Clade: Rosids
- Order: Zygophyllales
- Family: Zygophyllaceae
- Genus: Balanites
- Species: B. roxburghii

Binomial name
- Balanites roxburghii Planch.

Synonyms
- Agialid roxburghii (Planch.) Kuntze; Balanites indica Tiegh.; Balanites jacquemontii Tiegh.; Balanites rigida Royle ex B.D.Jacks.; Coccocypselum herbaceum Royle; Ximenia rigidum Royle

= Balanites roxburghii =

Species of plant

Balanites roxburghii is a spiny, evergreen tree in the family Zygophyllaceae. It is common in open sandy plains of the Indian peninsula, western Rajasthan, west Bengal, Maharashtra, Gujarat and drier parts of India. The specific epithet roxburghii refers to the Scottish botanist William Roxburgh.

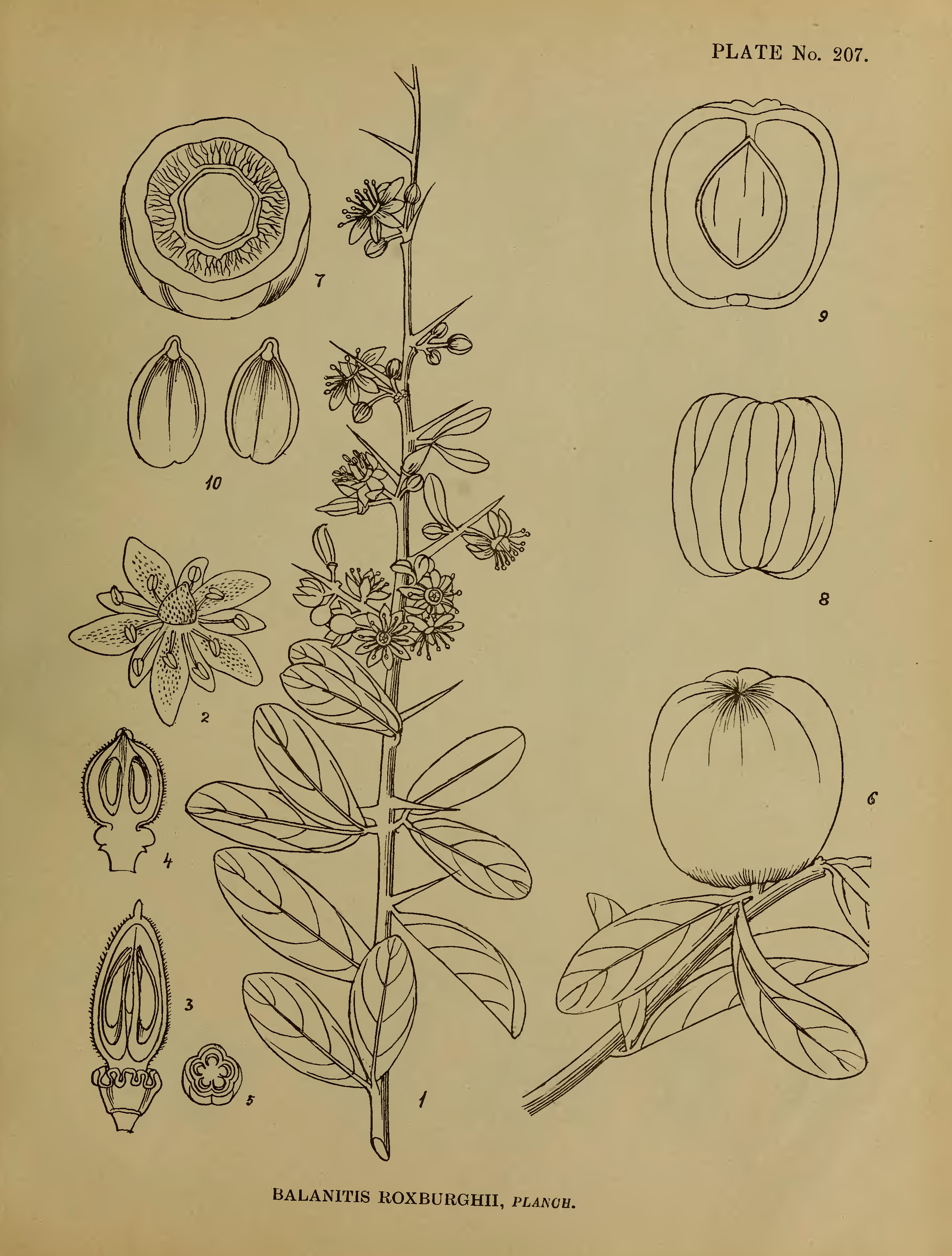
Botanical illustration of Balanites roxburghii.
