= Sericodes =

Sericodes may refer to:

- Sericodes (caddisfly), a genus of caddisflies in the family Leptoceridae
- Sericodes (plant), a genus of plants in the family Zygophyllaceae
