= Balanites rotundifolia =

Scientific classification
- Kingdom: Plantae
- Clade: Tracheophytes
- Clade: Angiosperms
- Clade: Eudicots
- Clade: Rosids
- Order: Zygophyllales
- Family: Zygophyllaceae
- Genus: Balanites
- Species: B. rotundifolia

Binomial name
- Balanites rotundifolia (Tiegh.) Blatt.

Synonyms
- Agialid rotundifolia Tiegh.; Balanites gillettii Cufod.; Balanites orbicularis Sprague; Balanites patriziana Lusina

Species of tree

Balanites rotundifolia, known in Swahili as Mbamba ngoma is a spiny bush or small tree from eastern Africa and southern Arabia. It is a member of the caltrop family, Zygophyllaceae.

== Description ==
Balanites rotundifolia is a small tree or shrub with a multi-stemmed growth form and spiny branches which grows to 2-5m. The small, round or heart shaped leaves are green, rather hairy, grow in pairs and lack stalks. The stout thorns are green, straight and grow to 3 cm in length. The greenish white flowers grow from the thorns and the small hairy fruit is 2 cm in length. When the fruit is ripe it is orange-yellow in colour.

== Distribution ==
Balanites rotundifolia is found in eastern Africa from Somalia and Somaliland into Sudan, and also in Yemen, specifically Aden.

== Habitat and ecology ==
Balanites rotundifolia occurs in arid tree savanna or scrub; semi-desert scrub; deciduous bushland and open woodland. It is often found growing in thin soils over lava or near rivers; it can be the dominant species in some habitats such as raised beaches over sandstones. Fruiting in Kenya occurs in February and in October and November. Often grows in association with Acacia, Commiphora or Combretum in arid areas. The flowers are pollinated by bees.

== Uses ==
=== Fruit ===
The ripe fruit has an edible and sweet pulp, the ripe fruits are either picked from the tree or gathered from the ground. The fruits are eaten as a snack, particularly by herdsmen. The seeds are edible if they are boiled for 3–4 hours, they are normally eaten with milk. The fruit pulp is fermented to make a local brew.

=== Smoking ===
The wood is used to smoke food for flavour and to sterilise milk containers.

=== Gum ===
Balanites rotundifolia is the source of a gum resin called Hanjigoad, which is used for chewing and is collected as tears or globular pieces.

=== Wood ===
The wood is used as firewood and to make charcoal. It is fashioned into poles, tool handles, carvings, utensils (e.g. head rests, wooden spoons and combs).

=== Fodder ===
The leaves and shoots provide fodder for domestic animals in very arid areas.

=== Other uses ===
It is used for live fencing and the cut branches are used to make fences, it is also planted in soil conservation projects. There are no known medicinal applications.
