= K. californica =

K. californica may refer to:

- Kallstroemia californica, the California caltrop, a flowering plant species native to the deserts of the southwestern United States and Mexico
- Neokochia californica, the rusty molly, a flowering plant species native to the valleys and deserts of southeastern California

== See also ==
- List of Latin and Greek words commonly used in systematic names § C
