= Balanites pedicellaris =

Conservation status
- Least Concern (IUCN 3.1)

Scientific classification
- Kingdom: Plantae
- Clade: Tracheophytes
- Clade: Angiosperms
- Clade: Eudicots
- Clade: Rosids
- Order: Zygophyllales
- Family: Zygophyllaceae
- Genus: Balanites
- Species: B. pedicellaris

Binomial name
- Balanites pedicellaris Mildbr. & Schltr.

Species of plant

Balanites pedicellaris is a species of flowering plant in the caltrop family, Zygophyllaceae. It is sometimes referred to by the common names small green-thorn or small torchwood. It is a small tree or shrub from Sub-Saharan Africa.

== Subspecies ==
Recognized subspecies include:

- Balanites pedicellaris subsp. pedicellaris
- Balanites pedicellaris subsp. somalensis (Mildbr. & Schltr.) Sands

== Description ==
Balanites pedicellaris is a multi-stemmed shrub or small tree, although some specimens may have a single fluted trunk. The branches are yellowish or greyish-green, bearing simple green spines. The leaves are alternate or grow on the spines, bifoliolate; the leaflets obovate, pale green, rather fleshy, down covered with a short downy petiole. The greenish-white flowers have 6 petals and are bunched in small, axillary clusters, approximately 1.4 cm in diameter. The fruit is a drupe, which is round or ellipsoid and normally flattened on either end, it measures 1·2–2·5 × 1·5–2 cm., the unripe fruit is usually covered in downy hairs but these are lost on the ripe fruit which is orange in colour. Grows up to 6m tall.

== Distribution ==
Balanites pedicellaris is native to Botswana, Eswatini, Ethiopia, Kenya, KwaZulu-Natal, Malawi, Mozambique, Northern Provinces, Somalia, Tanzania, Uganda, Yemen, Zimbabwe.

== Habitat ==
Balanites pedicellaris is found in dry woodland and scrub and on alluvial soils on floodplains, where there are scattered trees.

== Uses ==
The fruit is eaten but is not sought after. The fresh fruits are toxic and have a bitter taste, consumption causes thirst, dizziness and vomiting. An infusion made from the roots is used to treat fever and diarrhoea, the boiled root infusion is frequently added to milk given to children. The root infusion is used as an emetic by the Turkana people. The seeds are cooked and are an important source of food in northern Kenya, particularly in Turkana. The leaves are used as browse for domestic animals while the wood is used for carvings and to make torches.
