= Balanites angolensis =

Scientific classification
- Kingdom: Plantae
- Clade: Tracheophytes
- Clade: Angiosperms
- Clade: Eudicots
- Clade: Rosids
- Order: Zygophyllales
- Family: Zygophyllaceae
- Genus: Balanites
- Species: B. angolensis

Binomial name
- Balanites angolensis (Welw.) Mildbr. & Schltr.

Synonyms
- Balanites aegyptiaca var. angolensis Welw.; Agiella angolensis (Welw.) Tiegh.

Species of tree

Balanites angolensis, or Angolan green-thorn, is a species of tree from southern Africa, it is a member of the caltrop family, Zygophyllaceae.

== Description ==
Balanites angolensis is a small semi-deciduous tree or shrub which grows to up to 8m in height. It has rough, corrugated bark which is green or greenish yellow on young shoots which are covered in dense hairs with yellow or green thorns which are up to 9 cm long. The flowers are greenish-yellow to whitish and are borne in small axillary clusters, each flower consisting of 5 petals and 5 sepals. The fruit is 30mm long, ovoid in shape and is orange when ripe. The leaves are alternate, consisting of one pair of leaflets, 12-17mm in length, leathery, yellowish green and downy. The leaves are ovoid with a pointed tip and tapering base and a short stalk.

== Distribution ==
Balanites angolensis is found in Angola, Botswana and north eastern Namibia.

== Habitat ==
Balanites angolensis occurs along seasonal watercourses and in savannah, on dry hills and in coastal forest. In dry scrub forest and mopane woodland Balanites angolensis is part of the understorey community.

== Phenology ==
In Namibia Balanites angolensis flowers in October and November, fruit is seen from November but peaks in March and April.

== Uses ==
The fruit is edible, the branches are used by the Himba for fencing and the roots are used by the Himba to treat breast complaints in nursing mothers by inhaling the smoke of the burning roots and by making an ointment out of the ashes and smearing this on the breasts. Extracts from the tree are also used to treat genitourinary system disorders.

== Subspecies ==
There are two recognised subspecies:

- Balanites angolensis angolensis (Welw.) Mildbr. & Schltr. from Angola and Botswana.
- Balanites angolensis welwitschii (Tiegh.) Exell & Mendonça from north eastern Namibia.
