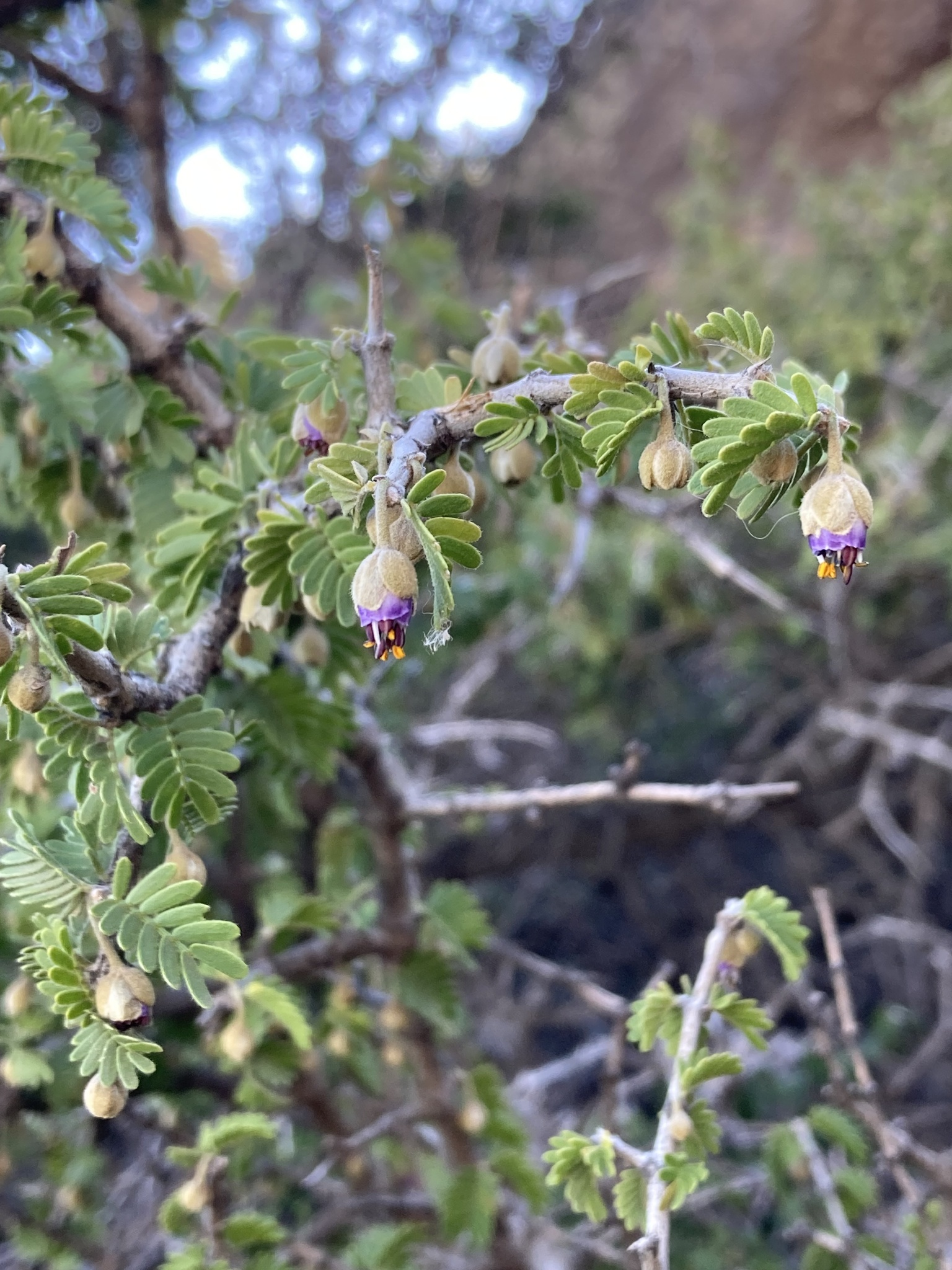
- A flowering specimen in Santiago Metropolitan Region.

Scientific classification
- Kingdom: Plantae
- Clade: Tracheophytes
- Clade: Angiosperms
- Clade: Eudicots
- Clade: Rosids
- Order: Zygophyllales
- Family: Zygophyllaceae
- Genus: Porlieria
- Species: P. chilensis

Binomial name
- Porlieria chilensis I.M.Johnst.

= Porlieria chilensis =

Species of tree

Porlieria chilensis is a species of flowering plant in the family Zygophyllaceae. It is endemic to Chile, where it is known as Guayacán and palo santo. It is a small tree or shrub, akin to other members of the genus which are all found in South America. It is distributed between the Coquimbo and O'Higgins Regions. An example occurrence of P. chilensis is in the arid forested area of central Chile, where it occurs in association with the endangered Chilean wine palm, Jubaea chilensis.

== Gallery ==
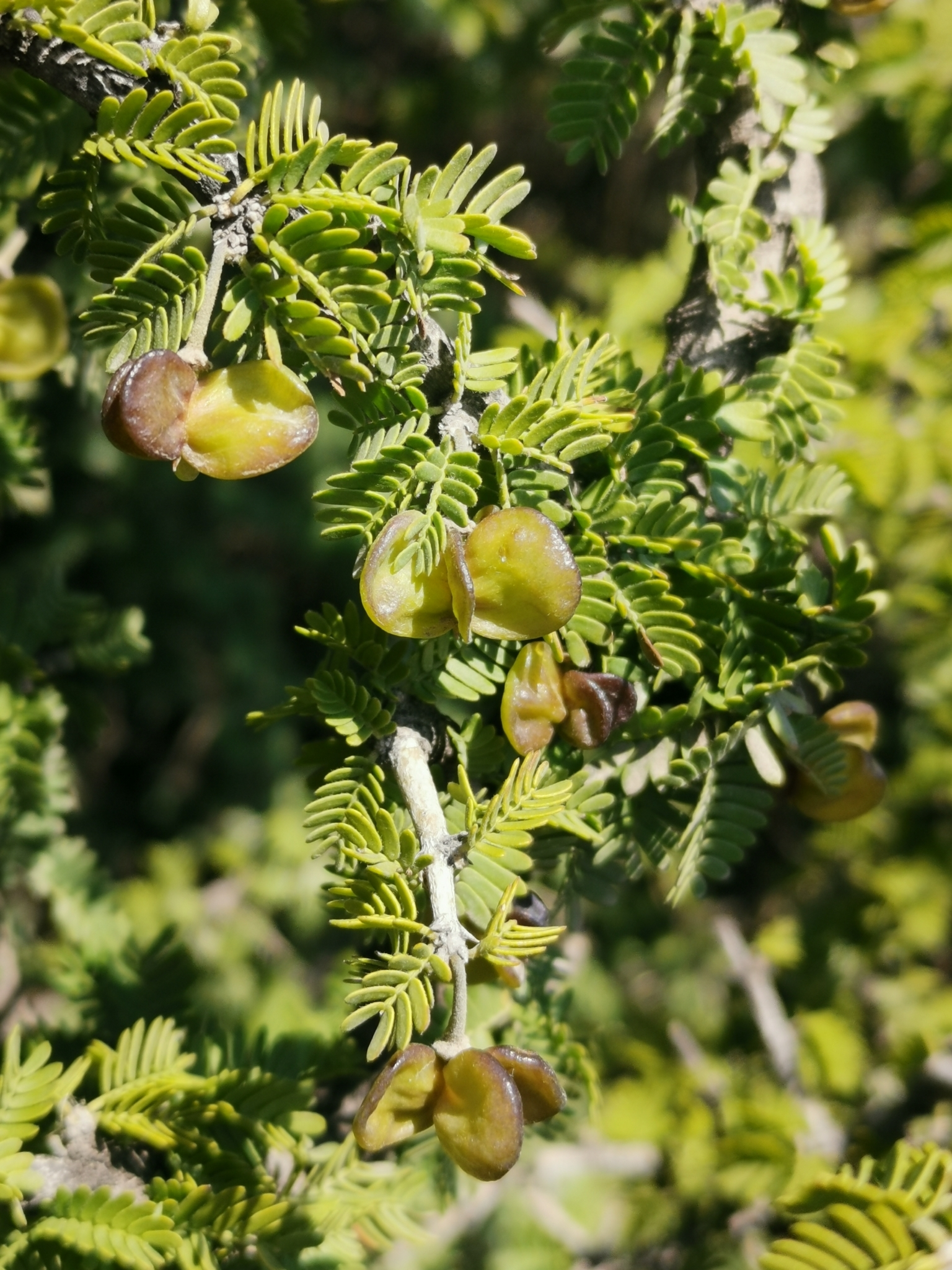
Leaves and fruits

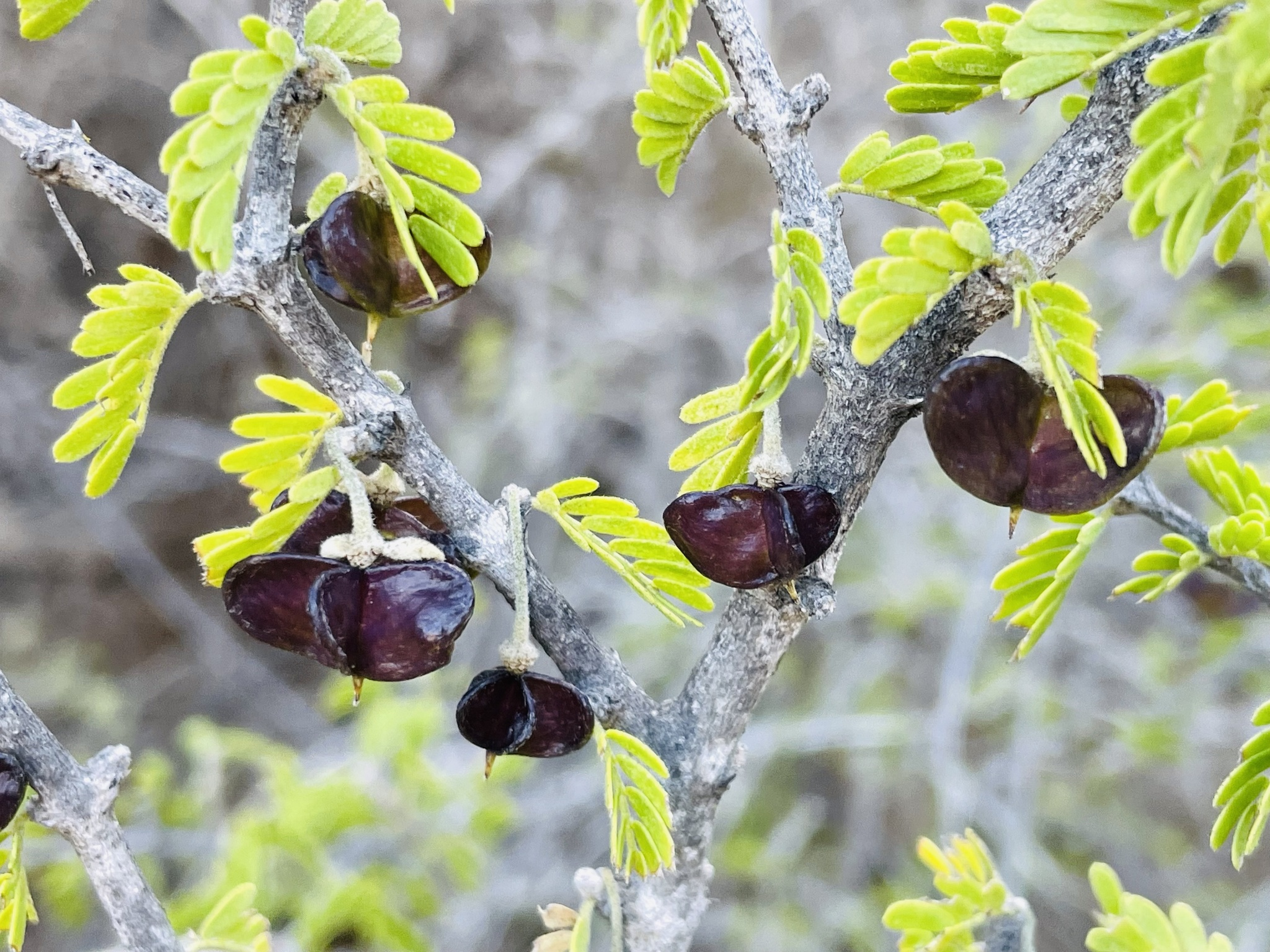
Leaves and fruits

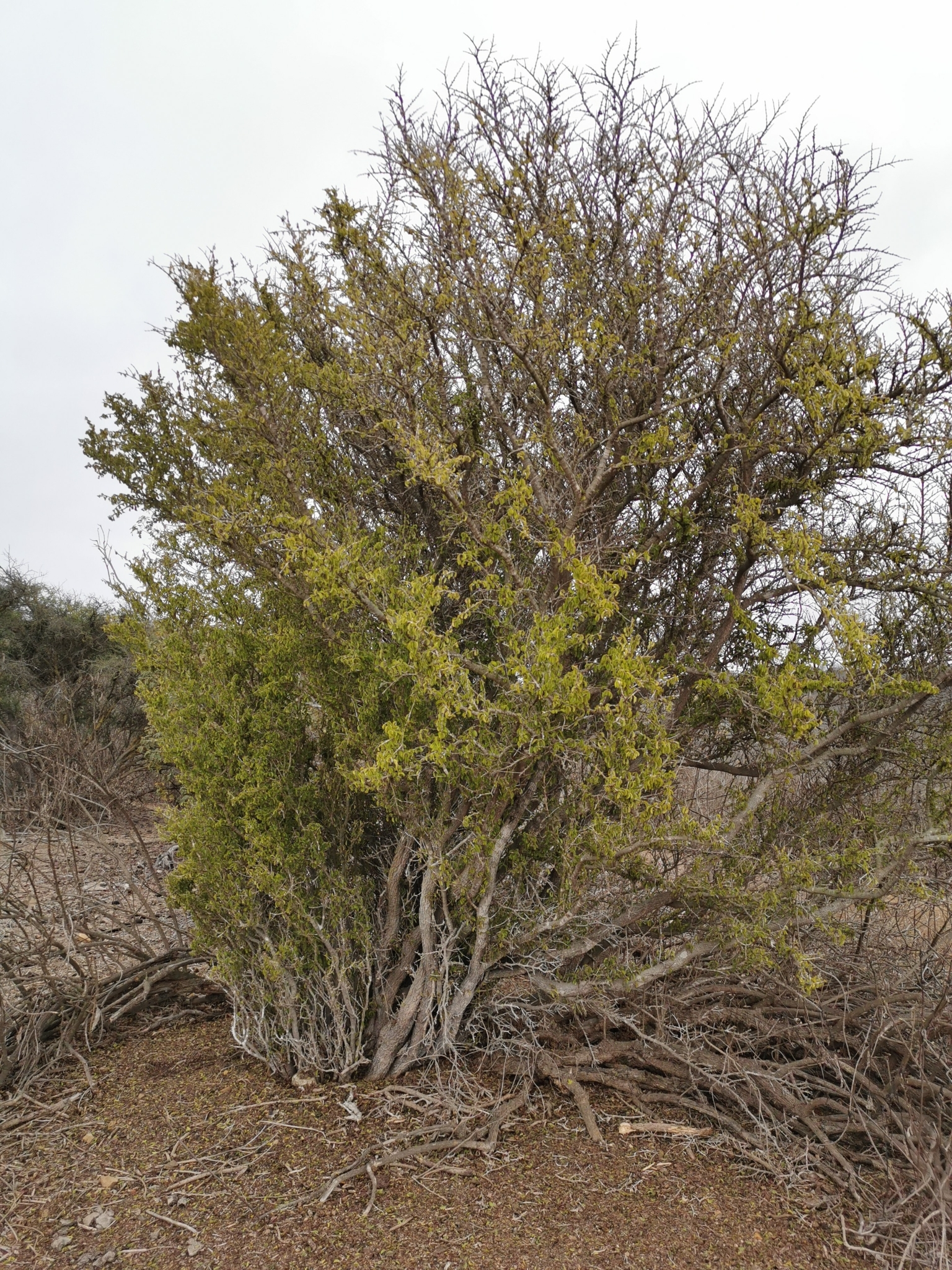
Habit in Valparaiso Region

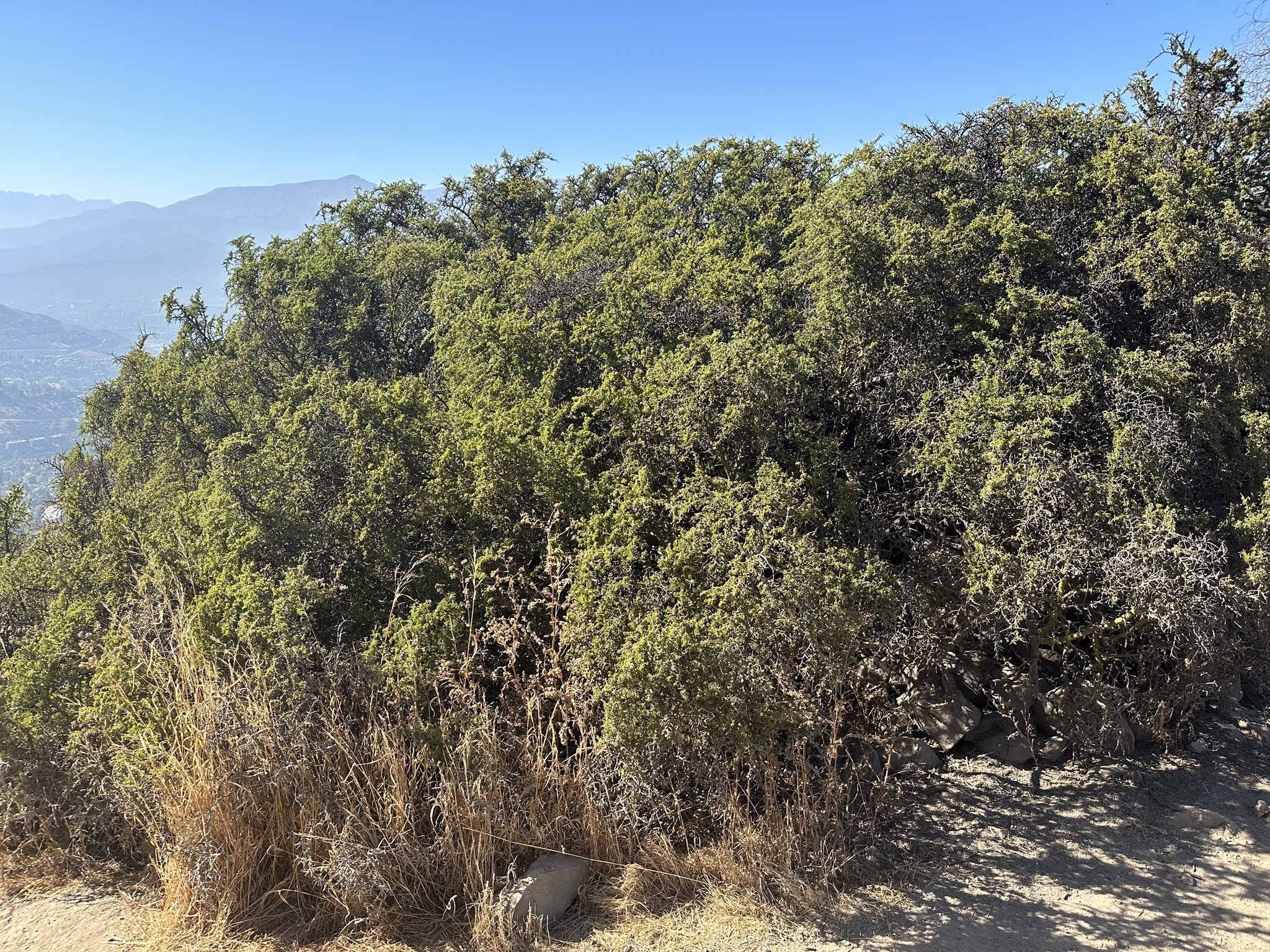
Habit in Metropolitan Region
