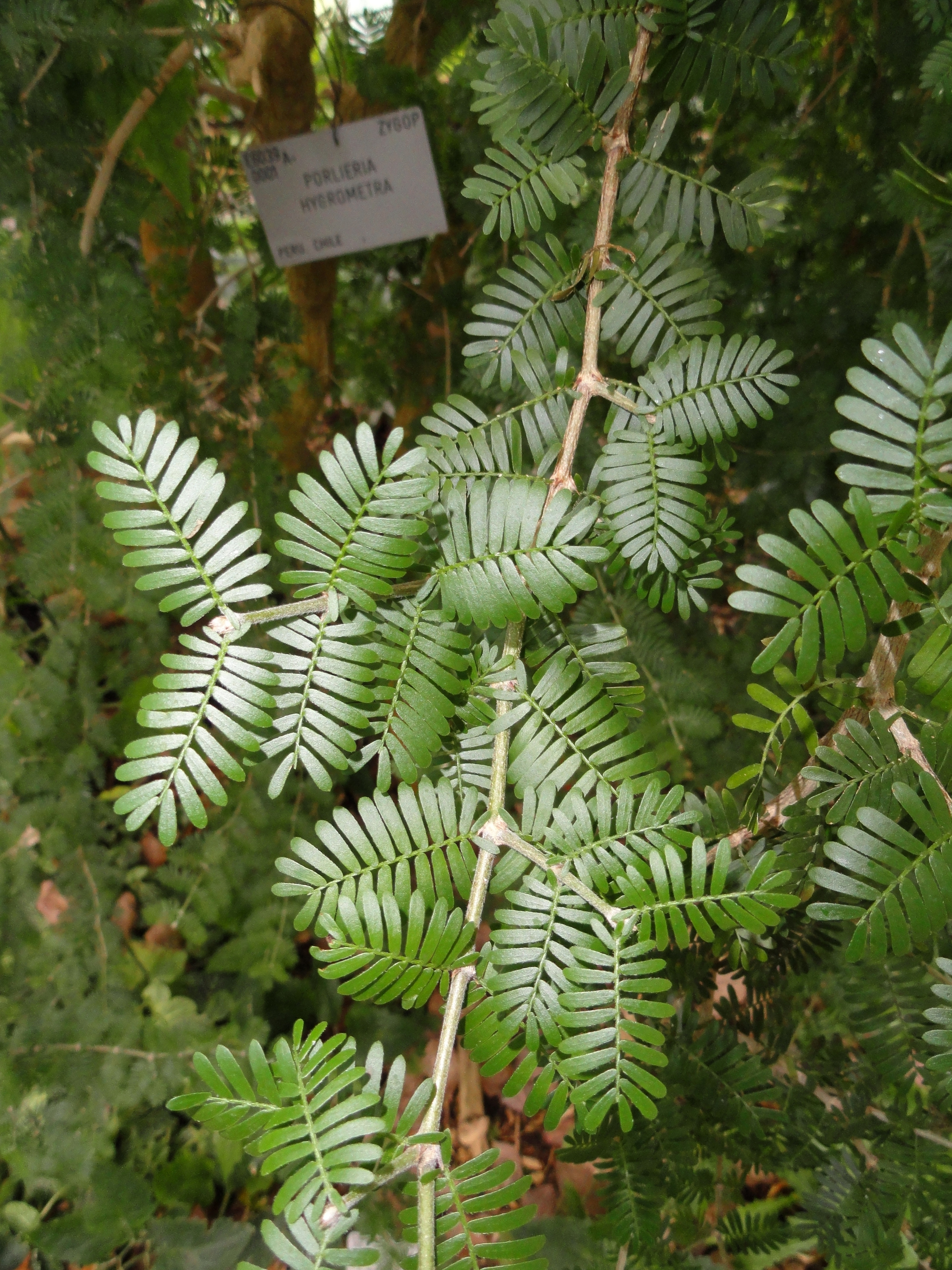

Scientific classification
- Kingdom: Plantae
- Clade: Tracheophytes
- Clade: Angiosperms
- Clade: Eudicots
- Clade: Rosids
- Order: Zygophyllales
- Family: Zygophyllaceae
- Genus: Porlieria
- Species: P. hygrometra

Binomial name
- Porlieria hygrometra Ruiz & Pav.

Synonyms
- Guaiacum hygrometrum (Ruiz & Pav.) Baill.; Porlieria hygrometrica Pav. ex A.Gray

= Porlieria hygrometra =

Species of tree

Porlieria hygrometra is a species of evergreen shrub in the family Zygophyllaceae. It grows to about 2 metres in height, and is native to Bolivia and Peru.
