= Balanites wilsoniana =

Scientific classification
- Kingdom: Plantae
- Clade: Tracheophytes
- Clade: Angiosperms
- Clade: Eudicots
- Clade: Rosids
- Order: Zygophyllales
- Family: Zygophyllaceae
- Genus: Balanites
- Species: B. wilsoniana

Binomial name
- Balanites wilsoniana Dawe & Sprague

Synonyms
- Balanites tieghemii A.Chev.

Species of tree

Balanites wilsoniana is a species of fruit-bearing tree from west and central Africa in the caltrop family Zygophyllaceae.

== Description ==
Balanites wilsoniana, commonly called the Boko Tree, is a tall rainforest tree to 35 m (115 ft) tall with high "lion's paw" buttresses, which continue up on the trunk as twisted fluting. The deep fluting may offer some defense against stranglers. The young trees have forked spines; If the bark is cut the tree exudes copious, scented gum. The leaves are bifoliate, with two 2.5 cm (1 in) leaflets on a common stalk, and are frequently slightly unequal-sided at their base. The buttresses can sometime be spiny, the trunk can grow to 1 m (3 ft) diameter and the tree can grow to 30-40 m in height, with an irregular crown. It has yellow green flowers borne in stalked clusters, the petals are pubescent on their inner surface. The fruit is a green drupe, 6–10 cm in length, ripening to yellow and has an unpleasant smell. A fibrous coat surrounds the stone. The seed is up to 8.8 cm (3.5 in) long by 4.7 cm (1.9 in) diameter; one of the largest seeds known.

== Distribution ==
Balanites wilsoniana is found from Ghana to Uganda and Tanzania south to Angola and the Democratic Republic of Congo. but has been recorded west of Ghana in Liberia.

== Habitat ==
Balanites wilsoniana is a found in semi-deciduous or evergreen rainforest, humid forest, lowland riverine forest, and also in coastal forest in Angola. It normally forms part of quite speciose associations; especially where there are clay-rich substrates. It occurs at elevations up to 1,200 metres above sea level.

== Ecology ==
The fallen fruit of Balanites wilsoniana are eaten by African elephants and by gorillas. Gorillas also eat the leaves. Elephants disperse the seeds, and juvenile trees are only recorded away from the adult trees in forests where elephants are present.

== Uses ==
A cooking oil is extracted from the seeds of Balanites wilsoniana, the seeds are pounded then boiled in water to extract the oil which is skimmed off the water once cooled. A healing, soothing ointment is made of the oil, as well as being used as a lubricant.

Despite its unpleasant smell, the fruit is regarded as edible.

A steroidal saponin, diosgenin, is present in the flesh of the fruit and in the stone, and is a substance of interest as a primary compound for the production of pharmaceutical steroids. The bark and roots are used to kill freshwater snails and for fishing. They are effective in killing the snails which host the parasite Schistosoma (cause of bilharzia in humans) as well as killing the larval stages of the parasite.

The wood of Balanites wilsoniana is fairly heavy, straight-grained and soft, initially it is white in colour but yellows with time. It is easily worked, polishes well, and is a suitable timber for building poles, carving, the handles of tools, spoons, walking sticks, furniture such as stools and grain mortars. It is also used for fuel and for making charcoal.

== See also ==
- Wilsoniana
