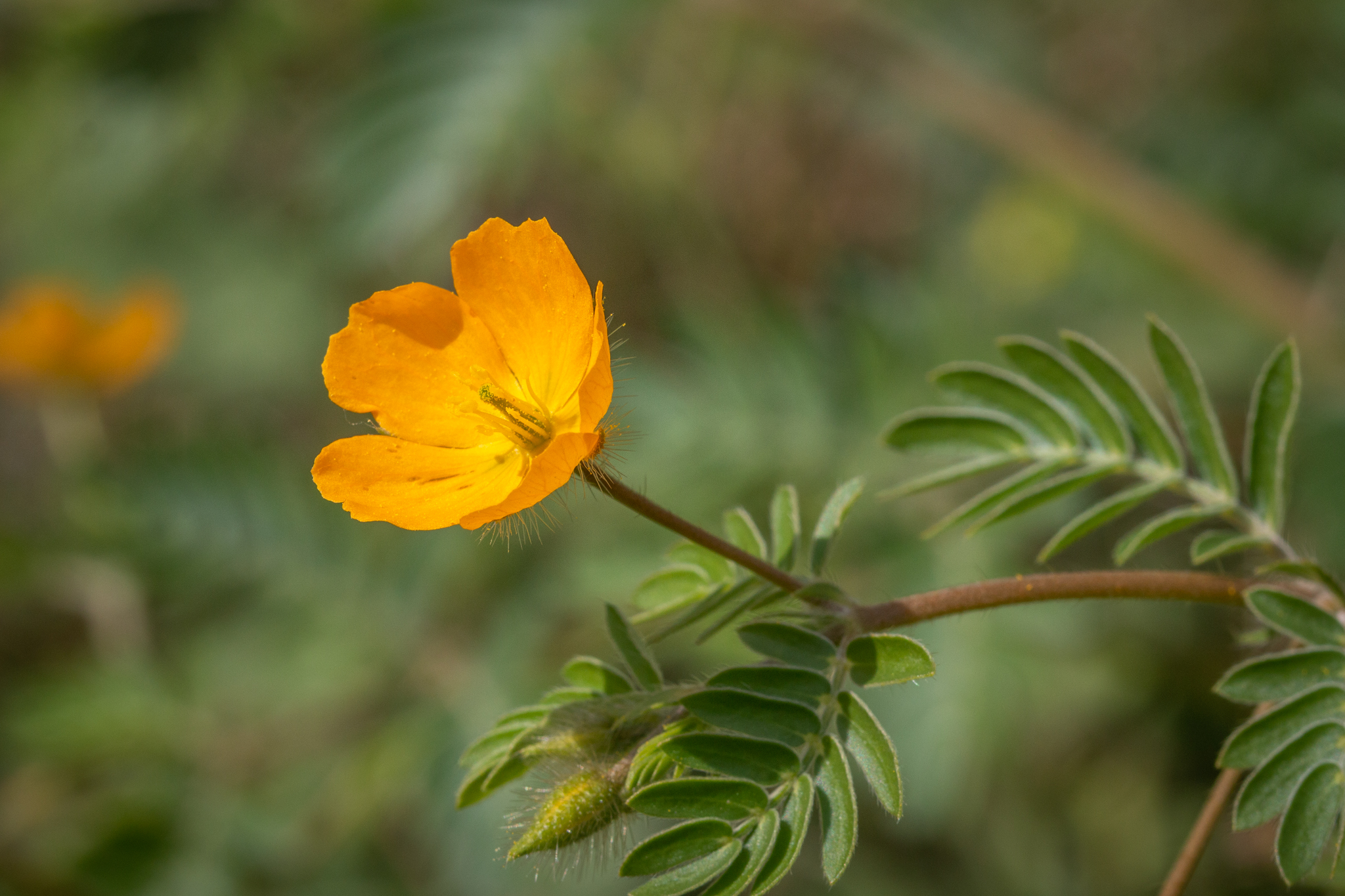
- in the Organ Mountains-Desert Peaks National Monument, New Mexico

Scientific classification
- Kingdom: Plantae
- Clade: Tracheophytes
- Clade: Angiosperms
- Clade: Eudicots
- Clade: Rosids
- Order: Zygophyllales
- Family: Zygophyllaceae
- Genus: Kallstroemia
- Species: K. parviflora

Binomial name
- Kallstroemia parviflora Norton

= Kallstroemia parviflora =

Species of flowering plant

Kallstroemia parviflora, also called small-flowered carpetweed or warty caltrop, is a species of flowering plant. It is found in the United States, and extends as far south as Central America. From east to west, it can be found from Illinois to Arizona. It is an orange or yellow small-flowered annual, with zygomorphic flowers consistent with the Zygophyllaceae, or creosote-bush family, to which it belongs. Leaves are compound and are 3–6 cm, with 4 pairs leaflets. The stem is pubescent and 30–60 cm. Flowers measure at 1 cm, while the ovoid fruit measures at 4 mm. The plant prefers dry soils and can be found in locations such as near roads and railroads.
