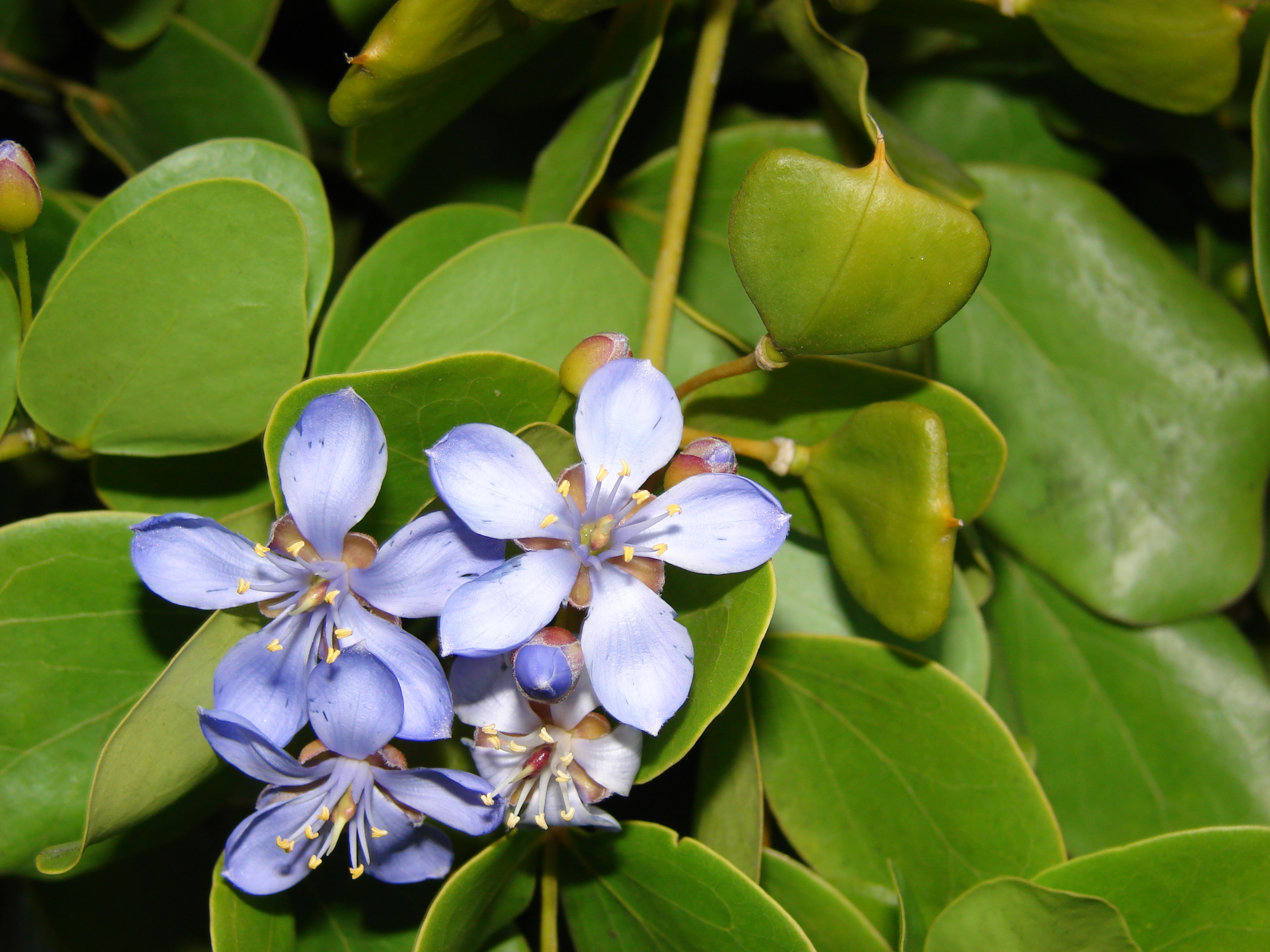
- Guaiacum officinale

Scientific classification
- Kingdom: Plantae
- Clade: Tracheophytes
- Clade: Angiosperms
- Clade: Eudicots
- Clade: Rosids
- Order: Zygophyllales
- Family: Zygophyllaceae
- Subfamily: Larreoideae; Sheahan & Chase

Genera
- Bulnesia; Guaiacum; Larrea; Pintoa; Porlieria

= Larreoideae =

Subfamily of flowering plants

Larreoideae is a subfamily of the flowering plant family Zygophyllaceae.

== Genera ==
- Bulnesia Gay
- Guaiacum L.
- Larrea Cav.
- Pintoa Gay
- Porlieria Ruiz & Pav.
