= Ulrich Jasper Seetzen =

German explorer (1767–1811)

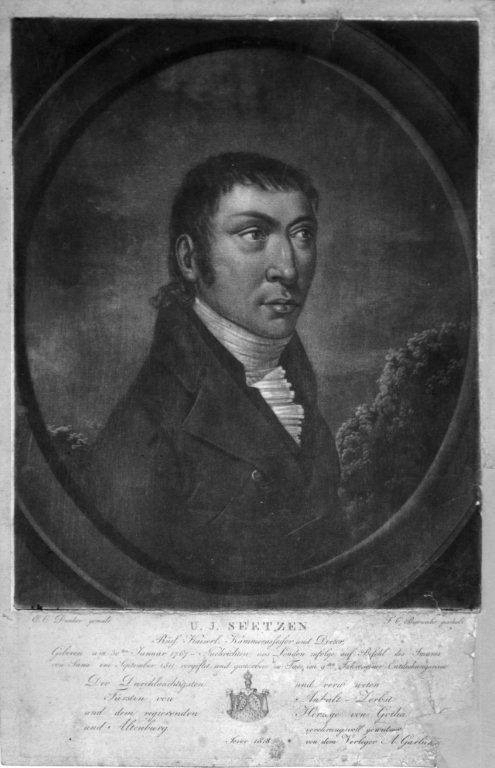
- Ulrich Jasper Seetzen. Mezzotint by F. C. Bierweiler after E. C. Dunker
- Born: 30 January 1767; Jever, Holy Roman Empire
- Died: 1811 (aged 43–44); Yemen
- Education: University of Göttingen

Ulrich Jasper Seetzen (30 January 1767 – September 1811) also known as Musa Al-Hakim was a German explorer of Arabia and Palestine from Jever, German Frisia. An alternative spelling of his name, Ulrich Iospar Sentzen, is sometimes seen in scientific publications.

== Early life ==
His father sent him to the University of Göttingen, where he graduated in medicine. His chief interests, however, were in natural history and technology; he wrote papers on these subjects which gained him some reputation. In 1802, he was appointed to a government post in Jever, but he was drawn to geographical exploration.

== Travels to Syria, Jordan, Palestine and Arabia ==
In the summer of 1802 he started down the Danube with a companion, Jacobson. After six months in Constantinople, he continued through Asia Minor to Smyrna, where he parted company from Jacobsen. He then travelled through the heart of Asia Minor to Aleppo. He remained there from November 1803 to April 1805 and studied Arabic. From this point on, he kept a full journal of his travels (April 1808 to March 1809), describing his exploration of Jordan, Palestine, the wilderness of Sinai, Cairo and the Fayum.

His chief exploit was a tour round the Dead Sea, which he did alone in the disguise of a beggar. From Egypt he went by sea to Jeddah and reached Mecca as a pilgrim in October 1809, after which he converted to Islam and changed his name to Musa Al-Hakim.

In Arabia he traveled from Medina to Aden and returned to Mokha, Yemen, from where he wrote his last letters to Europe in November 1810. In September of the following year he left Mocha with the hope of reaching Muscat, but was found dead two days later, allegedly poisoned by his guides on orders from the imam of Sanaa.

== Publications ==
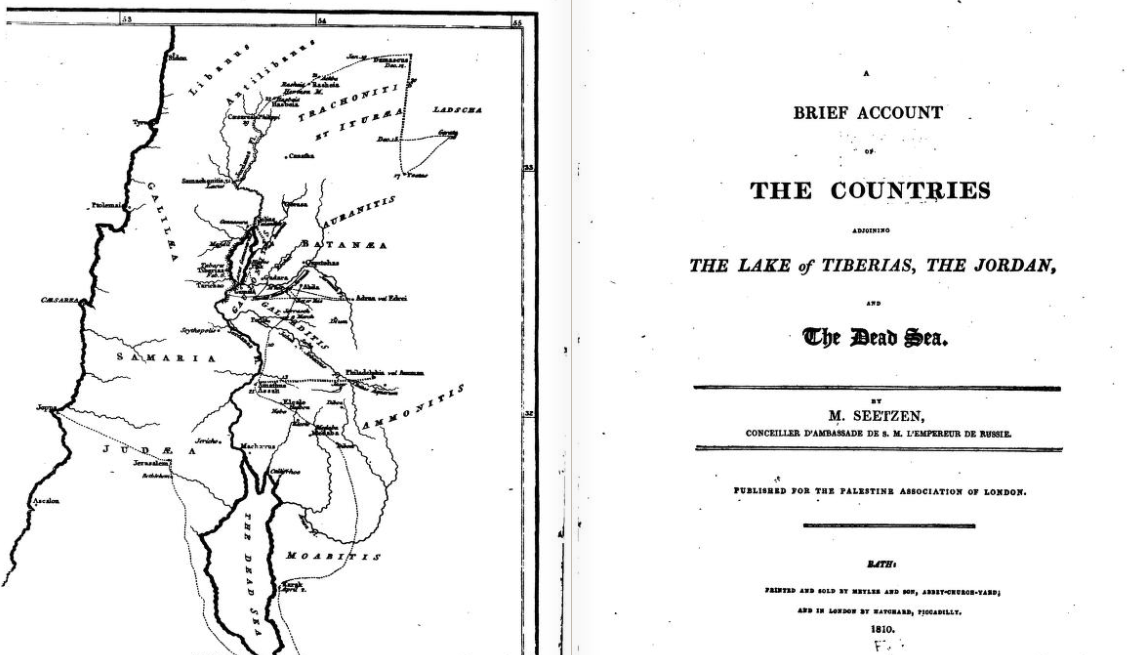
Front cover and map of Seetzen's 1810 publication

His exploits were first published in 1810 by the British Palestine Association.

For the parts of Seetzen's journeys not covered by the published journal (Reisen, ed. Kruse, 4 vols, Berlin, 1854), the only printed records are a series of letters and papers in Zach's Monatliche Correspondenz and Hammer's Fundgruben. Many papers and collections were lost through his death or never reached Europe. The collections that were saved form the Oriental museum and the chief part of the Oriental manuscripts of the ducal library in Gotha.

The American scholar Edward Robinson, writing in 1841, called Seetzen "judicious, enterprising and indefatigable."

== Commemoration ==
In 1826, Robert Brown published Seetzenia which is a genus of flowering plants from Africa and Asia, belonging to the family Zygophyllaceae and named in his honour.

== See also ==
- Danish Arabia expedition (1761–67)

== Bibliography ==
- Robinson, Edward; Smith, Eli (1841). Biblical Researches in Palestine, Mount Sinai and Arabia Petraea: A Journal of Travels in the year 1838. Vol. 3. Boston: Crocker & Brewster.
- "Ulrich Jasper Seetzen" . Encyclopædia Britannica. Vol. XXI (9th ed.). 1886. p. 621.
- Seetzen, Ulrich Jasper (1810). A Brief Account of the Countries Adjoining the Lake of Tiberias, the Jordan, and the Dead Sea. London: Palestine Association of London.
  - alt.: Seetzen, Ulrich Jasper (1810). A Brief Account of the Countries Adjoining the Lake of Tiberias, the Jordan, and the Dead Sea. London: Palestine Association of London.
  - alt.: Seetzen, Ulrich Jasper (1810). A Brief Account of the Countries Adjoining the Lake of Tiberias, the Jordan, and the Dead Sea. London: Palestine Association of London.
- Seetzen, Ulrich Jasper (1854). Ulrich Jasper Seetzen's Reisen durch Syrien, Palästina, Phönicien, die Transjordan-länder, Arabia Petraea und Unter-Aegypten (in German). Vol. 1. Berlin: G. Reimer.
  - alt.: Seetzen, Ulrich Jasper (1854). Ulrich Jasper Seetzen's Reisen durch Syrien, Palästina, Phönicien, die Transjordan-länder, Arabia Petraea und Unter-Aegypten (in German). Vol. 1. Berlin: G. Reimer.
- Seetzen, Ulrich Jasper (1854). Ulrich Jasper Seetzen's Reisen durch Syrien, Palästina, Phönicien, die Transjordan-länder, Arabia Petraea und Unter-Aegypten (in German). Vol. 2. Berlin: G. Reimer.
  - alt.: Seetzen, Ulrich Jasper (1854). Ulrich Jasper Seetzen's Reisen durch Syrien, Palästina, Phönicien, die Transjordan-länder, Arabia Petraea und Unter-Aegypten (in German). Vol. 2. Berlin: G. Reimer.
- Seetzen, Ulrich Jasper (1855). Ulrich Jasper Seetzen's Reisen durch Syrien, Palästina, Phönicien, die Transjordan-länder, Arabia Petraea und Unter-Aegypten (in German). Vol. 3. Berlin: G. Reimer.
  - alt.: Seetzen, Ulrich Jasper (1855). Ulrich Jasper Seetzen's Reisen durch Syrien, Palästina, Phönicien, die Transjordan-länder, Arabia Petraea und Unter-Aegypten (in German). Vol. 3. Berlin: G. Reimer.
- Seetzen, Ulrich Jasper (1859). Ulrich Jasper Seetzen's Reisen durch Syrien, Palästina, Phönicien, die Transjordan-länder, Arabia Petraea und Unter-Aegypten (in German). Vol. 4. Berlin: G. Reimer.
  - alt: Seetzen, Ulrich Jasper (1859). Ulrich Jasper Seetzen's Reisen durch Syrien, Palästina, Phönicien, die Transjordan-länder, Arabia Petraea und Unter-Aegypten (in German). Vol. 4. Berlin: G. Reimer.
