= Metharme lanata =

Scientific classification
- Kingdom: Plantae
- Clade: Tracheophytes
- Clade: Angiosperms
- Clade: Eudicots
- Clade: Rosids
- Order: Zygophyllales
- Family: Zygophyllaceae
- Genus: Metharme; Phil. ex Engl. (1890)
- Species: M. lanata

Binomial name
- Metharme lanata Phil. ex Engl. (1890)

Species of flowering plant

Metharme lanata is a species of flowering plant in the family Zygophyllaceae. It is the sole species in genus Metharme. It is a perennial herb endemic to the Arica y Parinacota and Tarapacá regions of northern Chile, where it grows in high-elevation deserts and dry shrublands.
