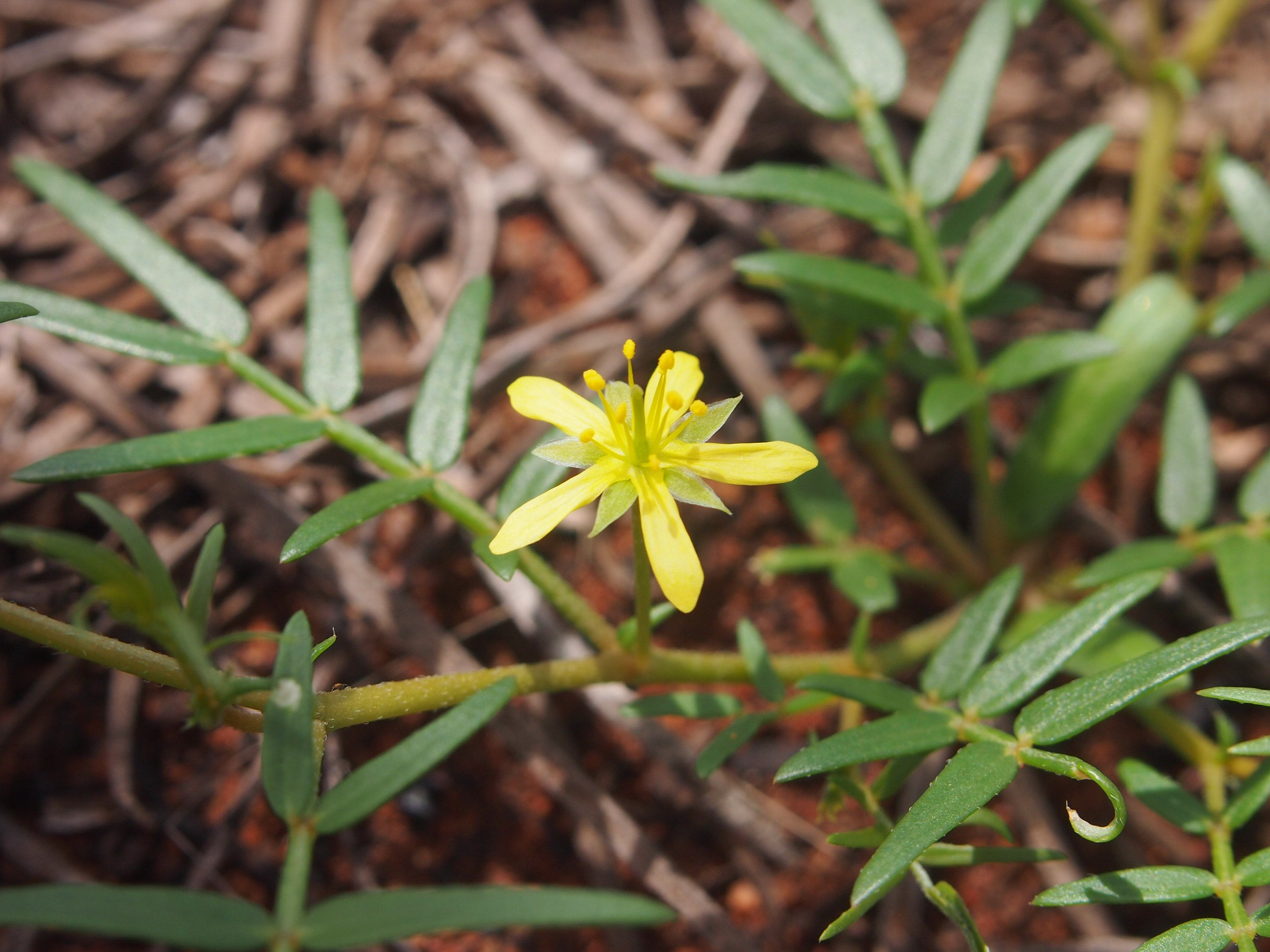
- Tribulopis angustifolia

Scientific classification
- Kingdom: Plantae
- Clade: Tracheophytes
- Clade: Angiosperms
- Clade: Eudicots
- Clade: Rosids
- Order: Zygophyllales
- Family: Zygophyllaceae
- Subfamily: Tribuloideae
- Genus: Tribulopis; R.Br.

Synonyms
- Tribulopsis F.Muell.

= Tribulopis =

Genus of flowering plants

Tribulopis is a genus of flowering plants belonging to the family Zygophyllaceae. Species of the genus are endemic to Australia.

The genus was first described in 1849 by Robert Brown.

== Species ==
The following species are recognised in the genus Tribulopis:

- Tribulopis angustifolia R.Br.
- Tribulopis bicolor F.Muell.
- Tribulopis homalococca (Domin) R.M.Barker
- Tribulopis marliesiae R.L.Barrett
- Tribulopis pentandra R.Br.
- Tribulopis sessilis (Domin) H.Eichler
- Tribulopis solandri R.Br.
