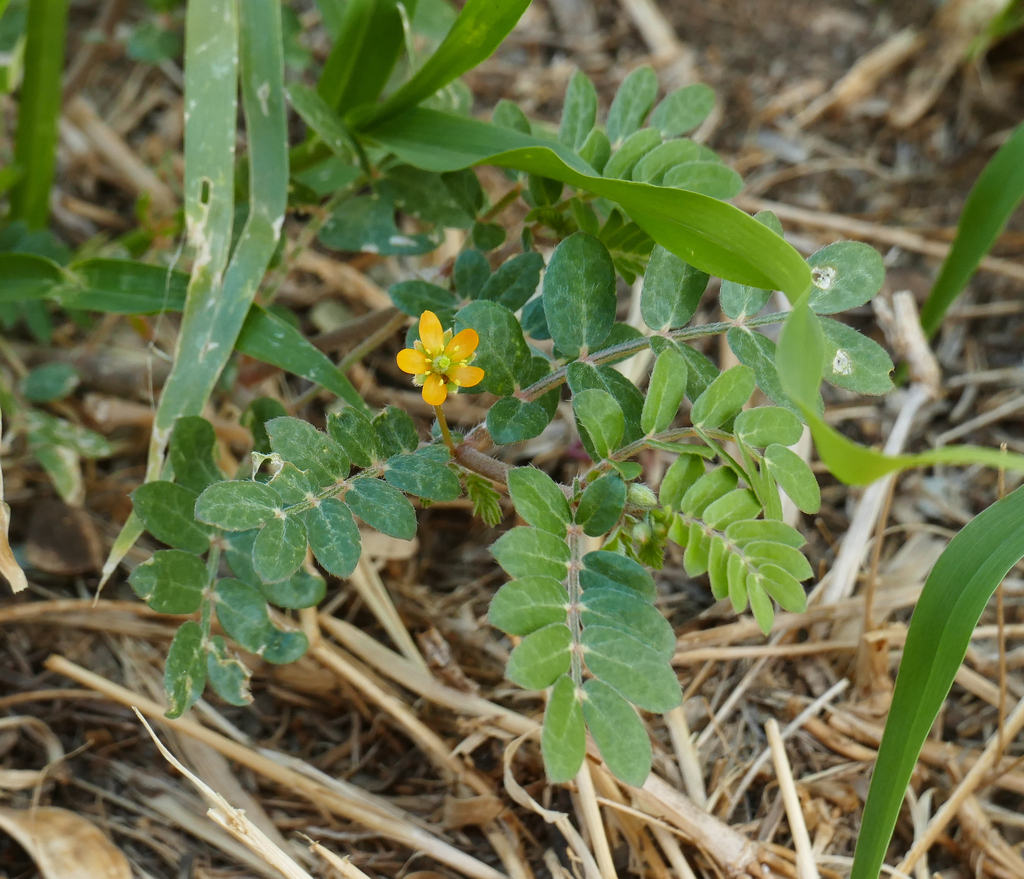

Scientific classification
- Kingdom: Plantae
- Clade: Embryophytes
- Clade: Tracheophytes
- Clade: Spermatophytes
- Clade: Angiosperms
- Clade: Eudicots
- Clade: Rosids
- Order: Zygophyllales
- Family: Zygophyllaceae
- Genus: Kallstroemia
- Species: K. californica

Binomial name
- Kallstroemia californica (S.Wats.) Vail

Synonyms
- Kallstroemia brachystylis

= Kallstroemia californica =

Species of flowering plant

Kallstroemia californica is a species of flowering plant in the caltrop family known by the common name California caltrop. It is native to the deserts of the Southwestern United States, California, and northern Mexico.

== Description ==
Kallstroemia californica is a mat-forming annual herb which grows in thick carpetlike masses on sandy substrates. The branching stem has compound leaves which are each made up of several widely spaced pairs of small oval-shaped green leaflets.

It produces individual flowers with five rounded or oval petals and a ring of ten stamens. The fruit is a small body a few millimeters wide of ten conjoined nutlets which split apart.
