= Neoluederitzia =

Conservation status
- Least Concern (IUCN 3.1)

Scientific classification
- Kingdom: Plantae
- Clade: Tracheophytes
- Clade: Angiosperms
- Clade: Eudicots
- Clade: Rosids
- Order: Zygophyllales
- Family: Zygophyllaceae
- Subfamily: Tribuloideae
- Genus: Neoluederitzia; Schinz
- Species: N. sericocarpa

Binomial name
- Neoluederitzia sericocarpa Schinz

Genus of flowering plants

Neoluederitzia is a genus of flowering plants in the caltrop family, Zygophyllaceae. The sole species is Neoluederitzia sericocarpa. It is endemic to Namibia. Its natural habitat is intermittent freshwater marshes. It is unusual within the family for being dioecious: having male and female flowers on separate plants.
