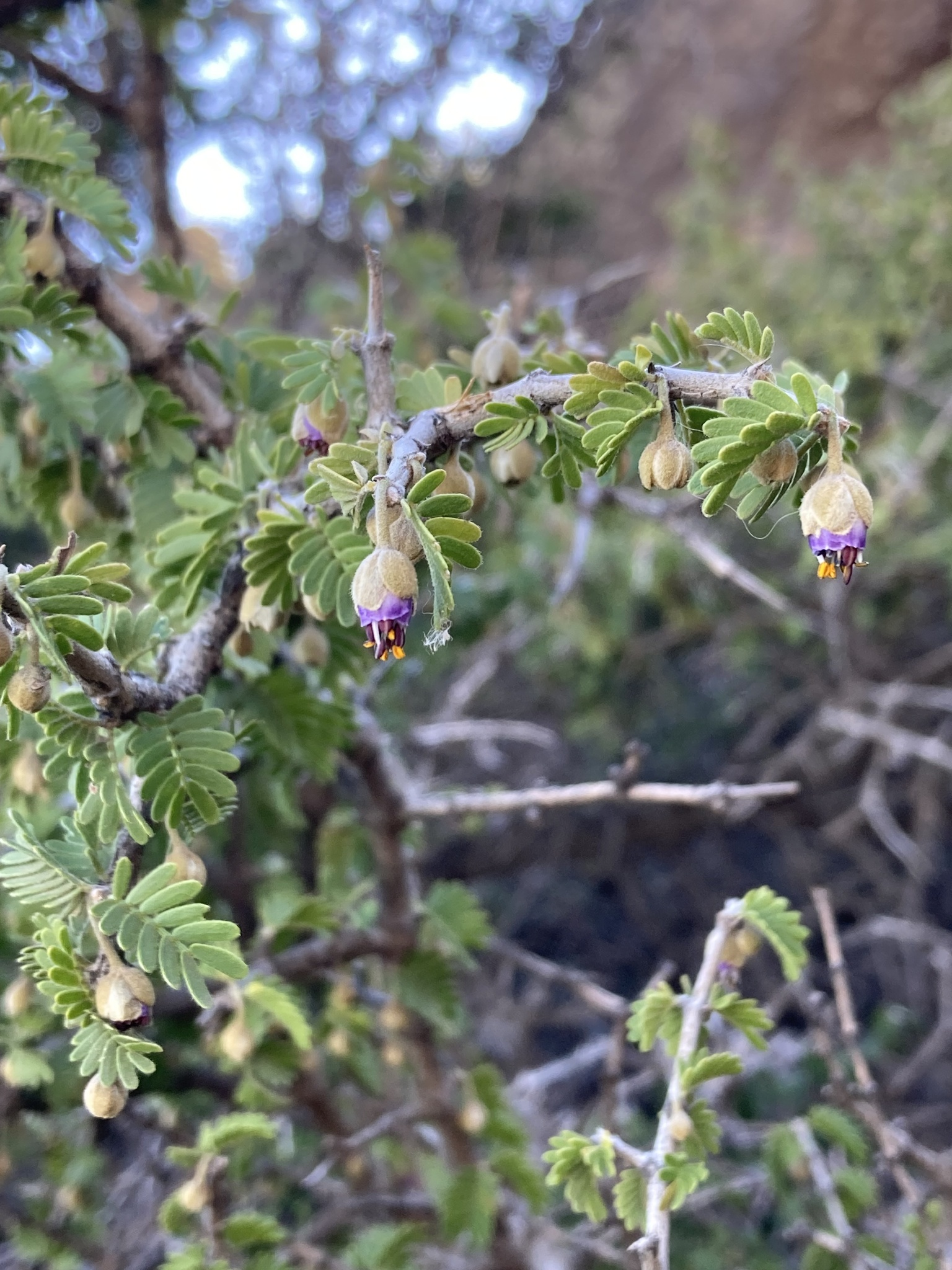
- Porlieria chilensis in Metropolitan Region, Chile

Scientific classification
- Kingdom: Plantae
- Clade: Tracheophytes
- Clade: Angiosperms
- Clade: Eudicots
- Clade: Rosids
- Order: Zygophyllales
- Family: Zygophyllaceae
- Subfamily: Larreoideae
- Genus: Porlieria; Ruiz & Pav.

= Porlieria =

Genus of flowering plants

Porlieria is a genus of flowering plants in the caltrop family, Zygophyllaceae. Species within this genus are shrubs or small trees of dry subtropical regions of South America. The generic name honours Spanish ambassador Don Antonio Porlier de Baxamar.

== Species ==
Accepted species include:

- Porlieria arida Rusby
- Porlieria chilensis I.M.Johnst. (endemic to Chile)
- Porlieria hygrometra Ruiz & Pav.
- Porlieria microphylla (Baill.) Descole et al.

=== Formerly placed here ===
- Guaiacum angustifolium Engelm. (as P. angustifolia (Engelm.) A.Gray)
