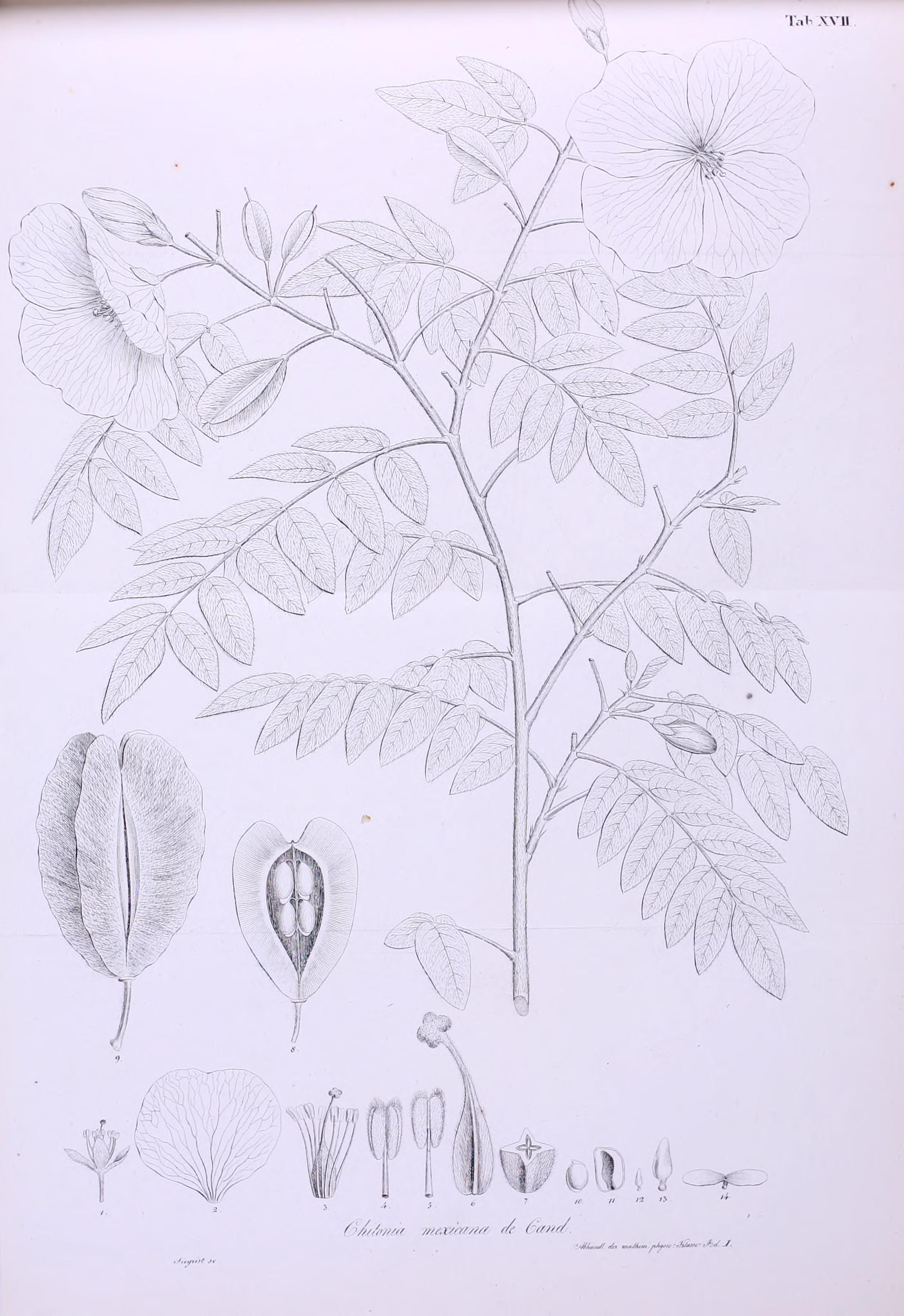
- Botanical illustration

Scientific classification
- Kingdom: Plantae
- Clade: Tracheophytes
- Clade: Angiosperms
- Clade: Eudicots
- Clade: Rosids
- Order: Zygophyllales
- Family: Zygophyllaceae
- Subfamily: Morkillioideae
- Genus: Morkillia; Rose & J.H.Painter

Synonyms
- Chitonia Moc. & Sessé ex DC.

= Morkillia =

Genus of flowering plant

Morkillia is a genus of flowering plants belonging to the family Zygophyllaceae. It is endemic to Mexico.

The genus name of Morkillia is in honour of William Lucius Morkill (1858–1936), general manager of the Mexican national railroad. It was first described and published in Smithsonian Misc. Collect. Vol.50 on page 33 in 1907.

Known species, according to Kew:

- Morkillia acuminata Rose & J.H.Painter
- Morkillia mexicana (Moc. & Sessé ex DC.) Rose & J.H.Painter
