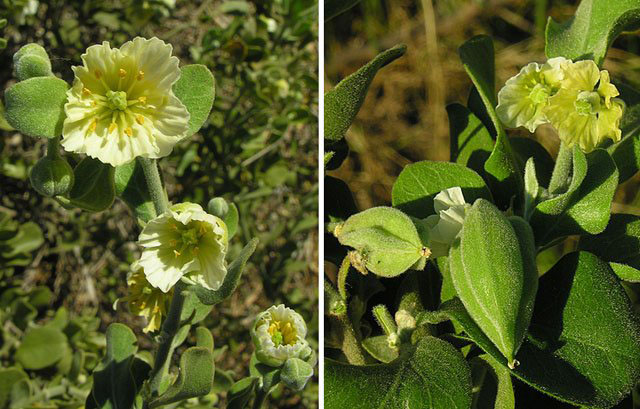
- Viscainoa geniculata

Scientific classification
- Kingdom: Plantae
- Clade: Tracheophytes
- Clade: Angiosperms
- Clade: Eudicots
- Clade: Rosids
- Order: Zygophyllales
- Family: Zygophyllaceae
- Genus: Viscainoa; Greene

= Viscainoa =

Genus of flowering plants

Viscainoa is a genus of flowering plants belonging to the family Zygophyllaceae. It is in the subfamily Morkillioideae. It is endemic to north-western Mexico.

Known species:

- Viscainoa geniculata (Kellogg) Greene
- Viscainoa pinnata (I.M.Johnst.) Gentry

The genus name of Viscainoa is in honour of Sebastián Vizcaíno (1548 – c. 1625), a Spanish soldier, entrepreneur, explorer, and diplomat. It was first described and published in Pittonia Vol.1 on page 163 in 1888.
