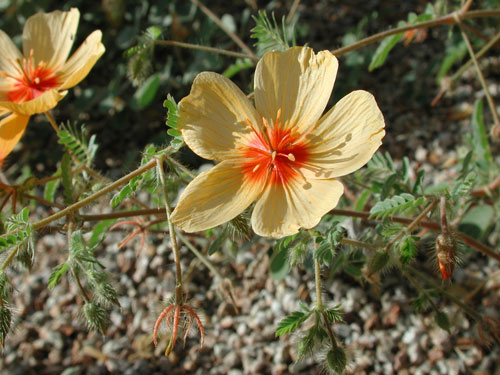

Scientific classification
- Kingdom: Plantae
- Clade: Tracheophytes
- Clade: Angiosperms
- Clade: Eudicots
- Clade: Rosids
- Order: Zygophyllales
- Family: Zygophyllaceae
- Genus: Kallstroemia
- Species: K. grandiflora

Binomial name
- Kallstroemia grandiflora A.Gray

= Kallstroemia grandiflora =

Species of flowering plant

Kallstroemia grandiflora, the Arizona poppy, is a species of summer annual herb inhabiting the deserts of the Southwestern United States, California, and northern Mexico. It is not related to true poppies.

Kallstroemia grandiflora has opposite, pinnately compound leaves. Large showy flowers often appear in abundance after summer monsoon rains, with bristly trichomes, stipules, and orange corollas.

== Gallery ==
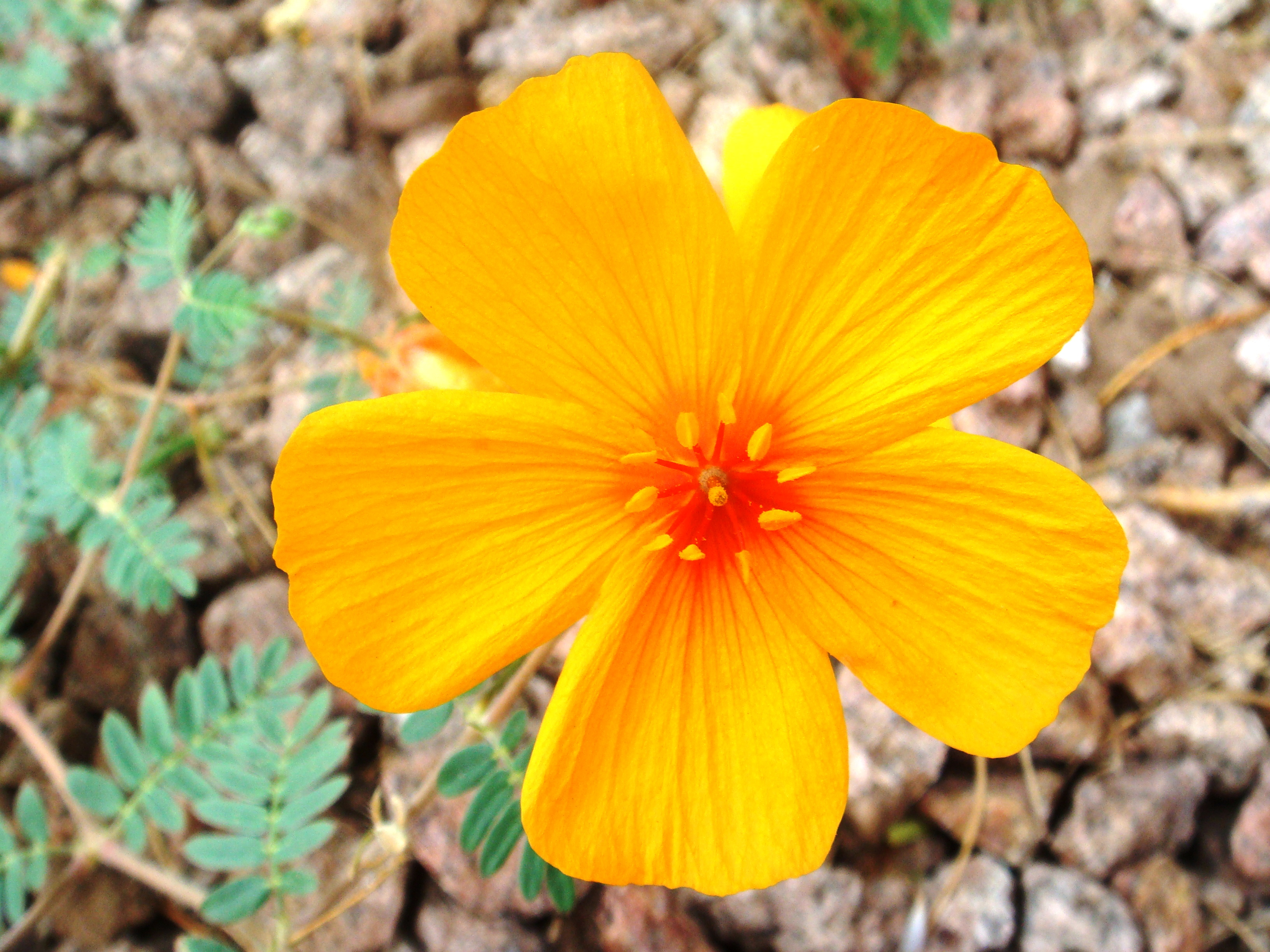
Kallstroemia grandiflora:
the Arizona Poppy flower

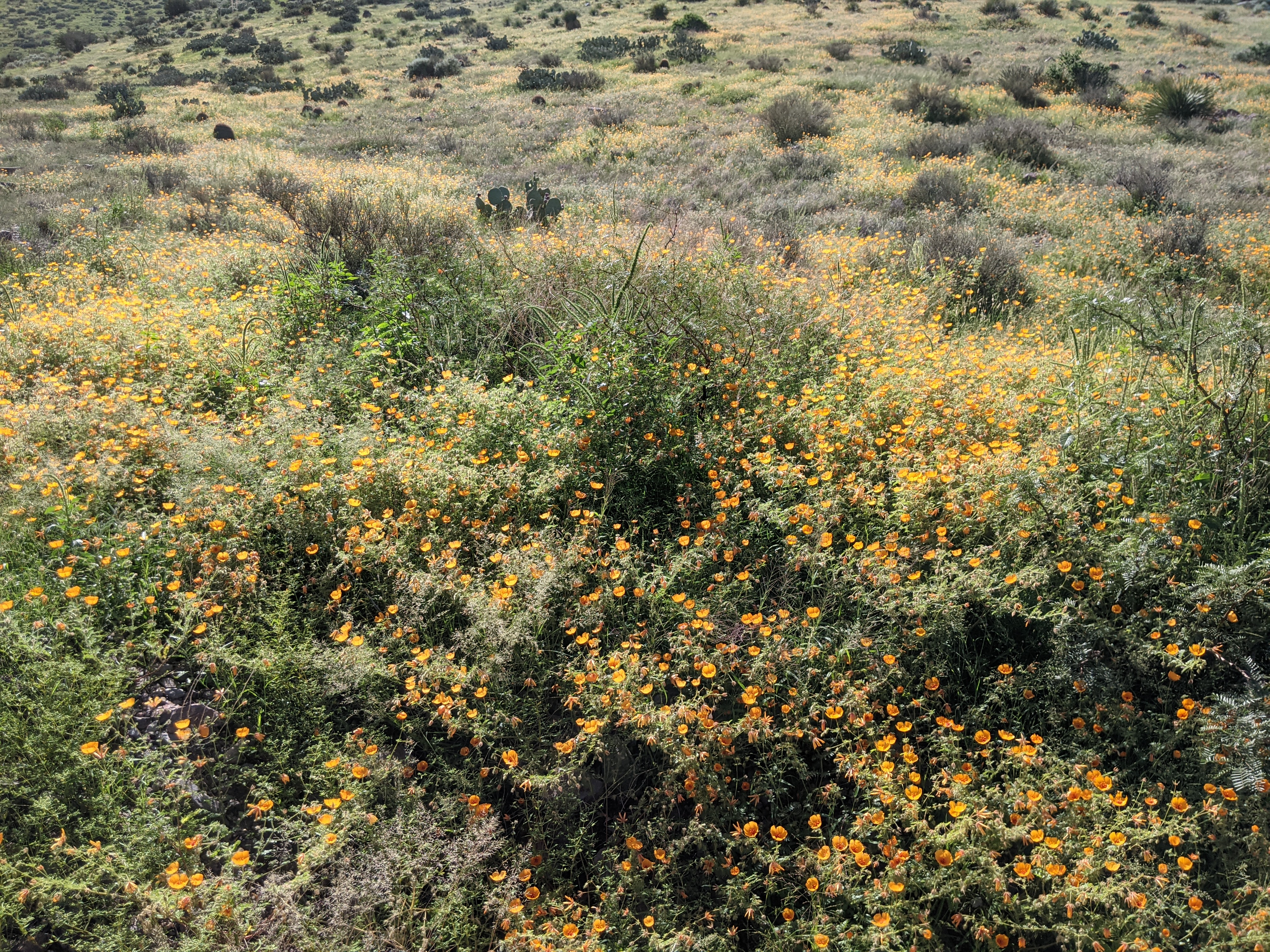
Kallstroemia grandiflora spreads out across a hillside at Rockhound State Park
