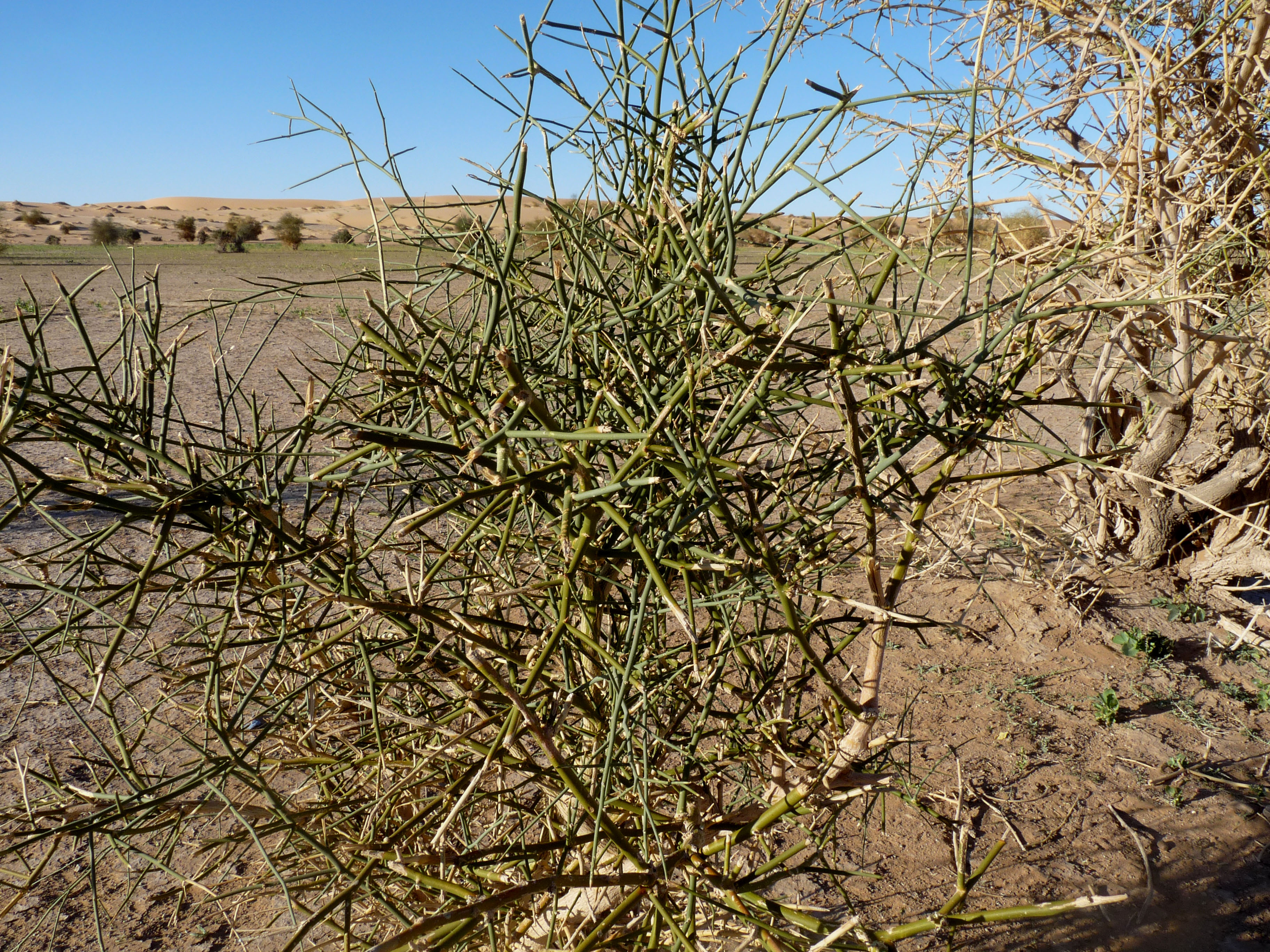
- Balanites aegyptiaca

Scientific classification
- Kingdom: Plantae
- Clade: Tracheophytes
- Clade: Angiosperms
- Clade: Eudicots
- Clade: Rosids
- Order: Zygophyllales
- Family: Zygophyllaceae
- Subfamily: Tribuloideae
- Genus: Balanites; Delile

Species
- See text

= Balanites =

Genus of flowering plants

Balanites is an Afrotropical, Palearctic and Indomalayan genus of flowering plants in the caltrop family, Zygophyllaceae. The name Balanites derives from the Greek word for an acorn and refers to the fruit. It was coined by Alire Delile in 1813.

== Species ==
The following species are included in the genus Balanites:

- Balanites aegyptiaca (L.) Delile
- Balanites angolensis (Welw.) Mildbr. & Schltr.
- Balanites glabra Mildbr. & Schltr.
- Balanites maughamii Sprague
- Balanites pedicellaris Mildbr. & Schltr.
- Balanites rotundifolia (Tiegh.) Blatt.
- Balanites roxburghii Planch.
- Balanites triflora Tiegh.
- Balanites wilsoniana Dawe & Sprague
