= Seetzenia =

- Flowering Seetzenia lanata growing in Oman

Scientific classification
- Kingdom: Plantae
- Clade: Tracheophytes
- Clade: Angiosperms
- Clade: Eudicots
- Clade: Rosids
- Order: Zygophyllales
- Family: Zygophyllaceae
- Genus: Seetzenia; R.Br.

Type species
- Seetzenia orientalis Decne.

Species
- See here

Genus of flowering plants

Seetzenia is a genus of flowering plants belonging to the family Zygophyllaceae.

== Description ==
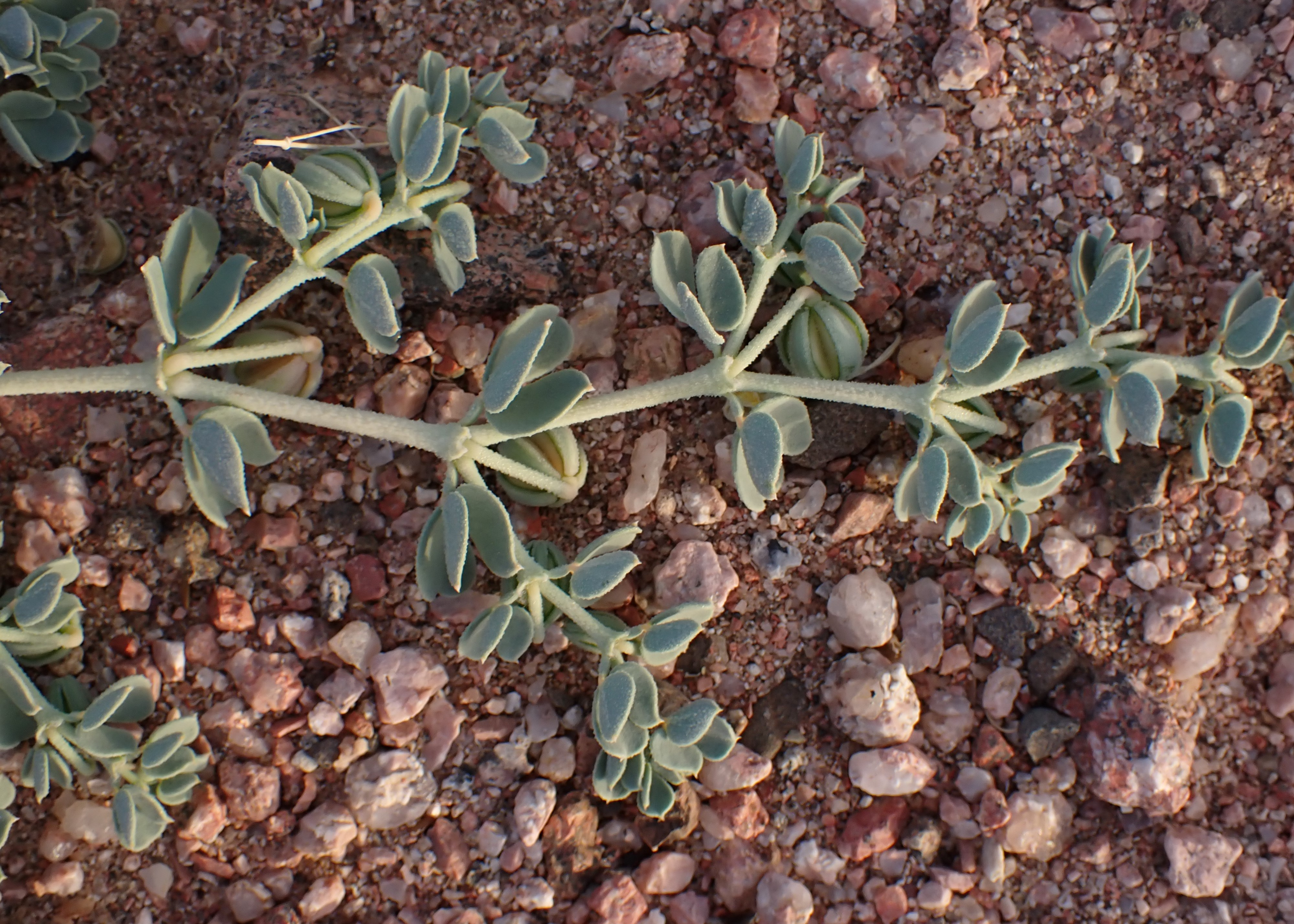
Seetzenia orientalis growing in Jordan

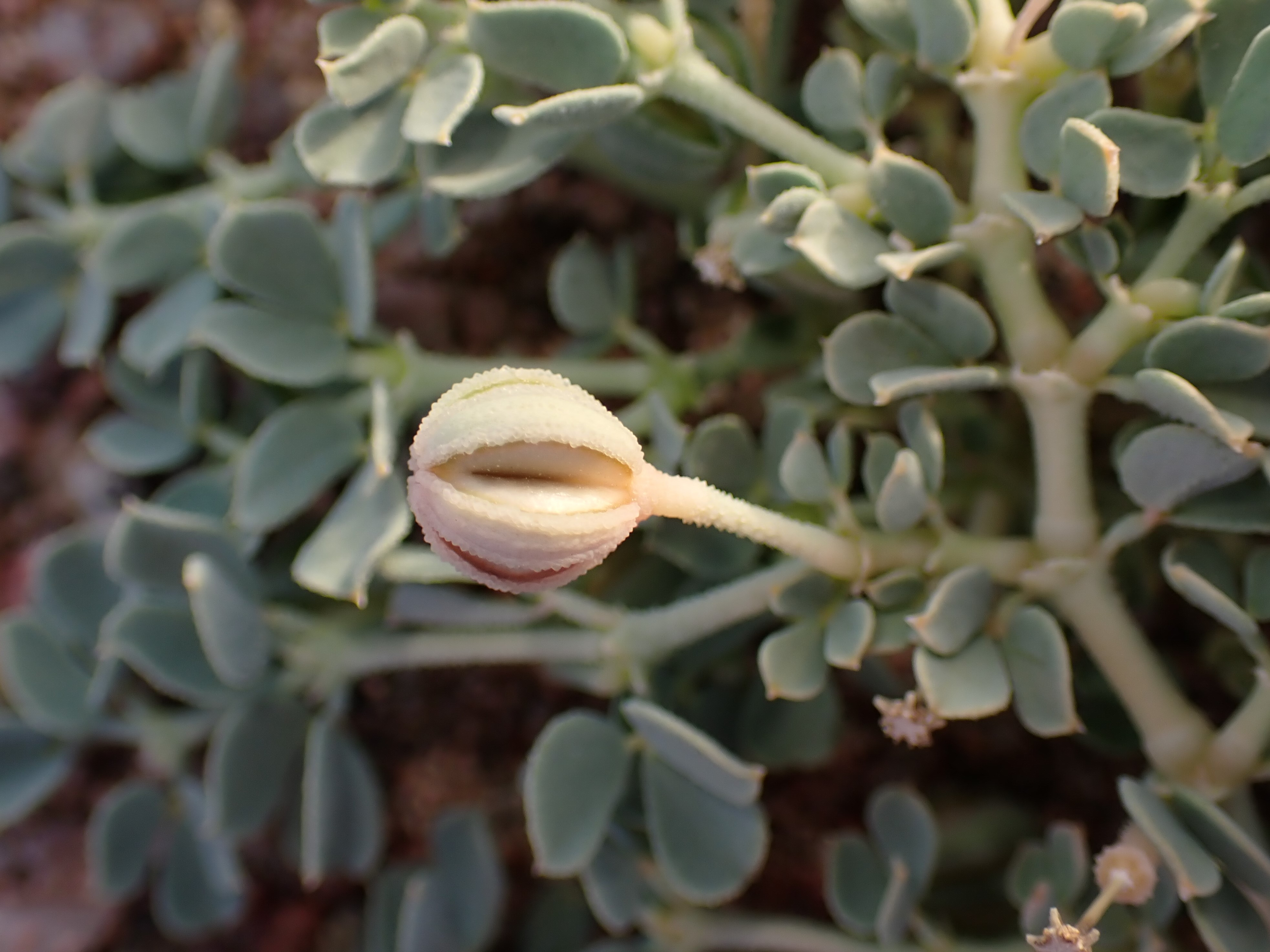
Seetzenia orientalis growing in Jordan

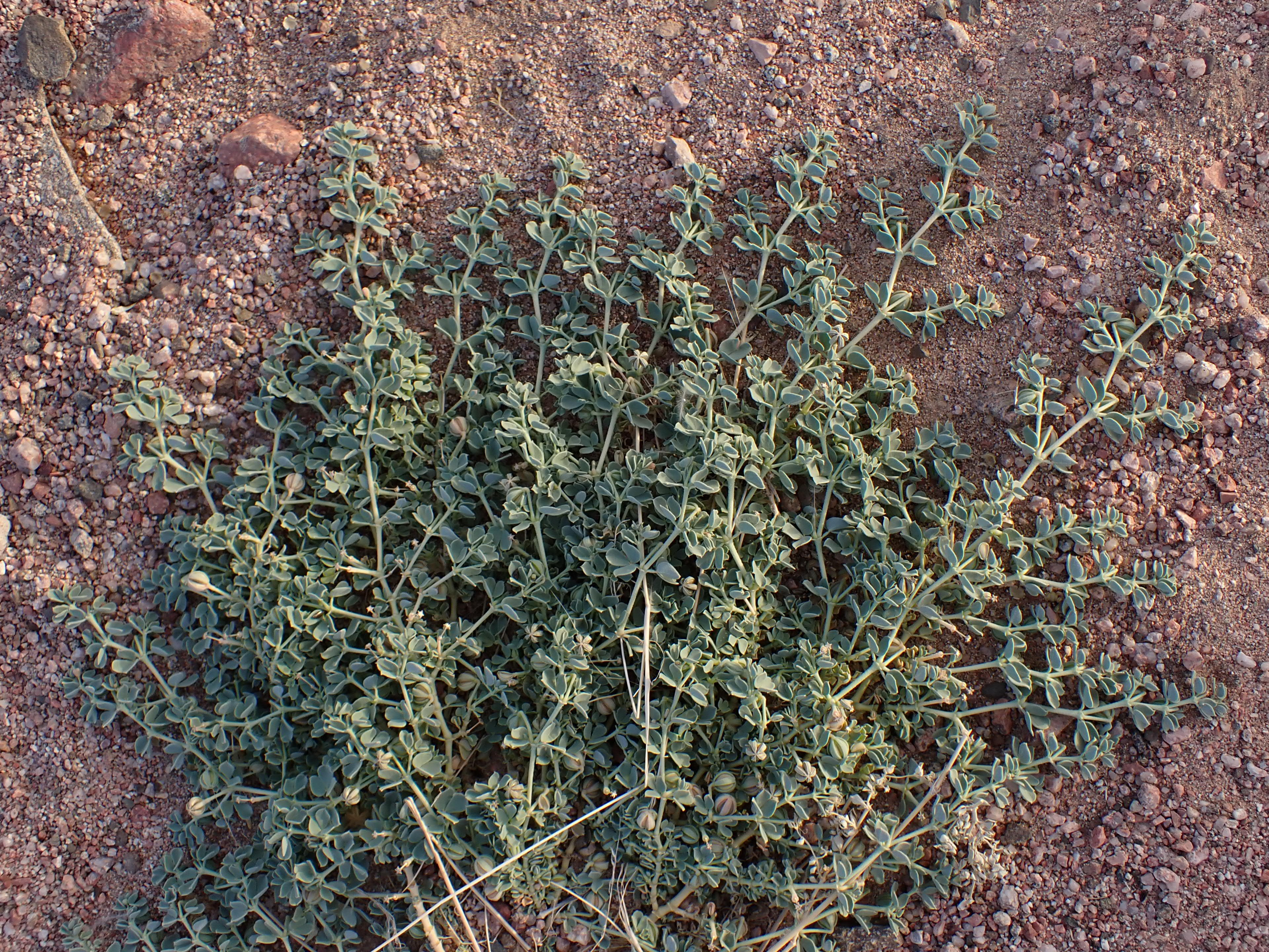
Seetzenia orientalis growing in Jordan

=== Vegetative characteristics ===
Seetzenia are prostrate, perennial herbs with oppositely arranged, stipulate, trifoliolate leaves.

=== Generative characteristics ===
The small, pedicellate, actinomorphic, bisexual flowers have 5 sepals and no petals. The androecium consists of 5 stamens. The gynoecium consists of 5 carpels. The capsule fruit produces oval seeds.

== Taxonomy ==
It was described by Robert Brown in 1826. The type species is Seetzenia orientalis Decne. It is placed in the subfamily Seetzenioideae.

=== Etymology ===
The genus name of Seetzenia is in honour of Ulrich Jasper Seetzen (1767–1811), a German explorer of Arabia and Palestine from Jever, German Frisia.

=== Species ===
It has two accepted species:

- Seetzenia lanata (Willd.) Bullock
- Seetzenia orientalis Decne.

== Distribution and habitat ==
Its native range is the Sahara to north-eastern Tropical Africa (in Algeria, the Cape Provinces, Chad, Egypt, Libya, Mauritania, Niger, Somalia, Sudan and the Western Sahara), Arabian Peninsula (in Afghanistan, the Gulf States, Kuwait, Oman, Pakistan, Palestine, Saudi Arabia, and Yemen), the Sinai to India.
