= Kelleronia =

Scientific classification
- Kingdom: Plantae
- Clade: Tracheophytes
- Clade: Angiosperms
- Clade: Eudicots
- Clade: Rosids
- Order: Zygophyllales
- Family: Zygophyllaceae
- Subfamily: Tribuloideae
- Genus: Kelleronia; Schinz

Genus of plants

Kelleronia is a genus of flowering plants belonging to the family Zygophyllaceae.

Its native range is Ethiopia and Somalia in northeastern Tropical Africa and Oman in the southern Arabian Peninsula.

Species:

- Kelleronia gillettiae Baker f.
- Kelleronia revoilii (Franch.) Chiov.
- Kelleronia splendens Schinz
