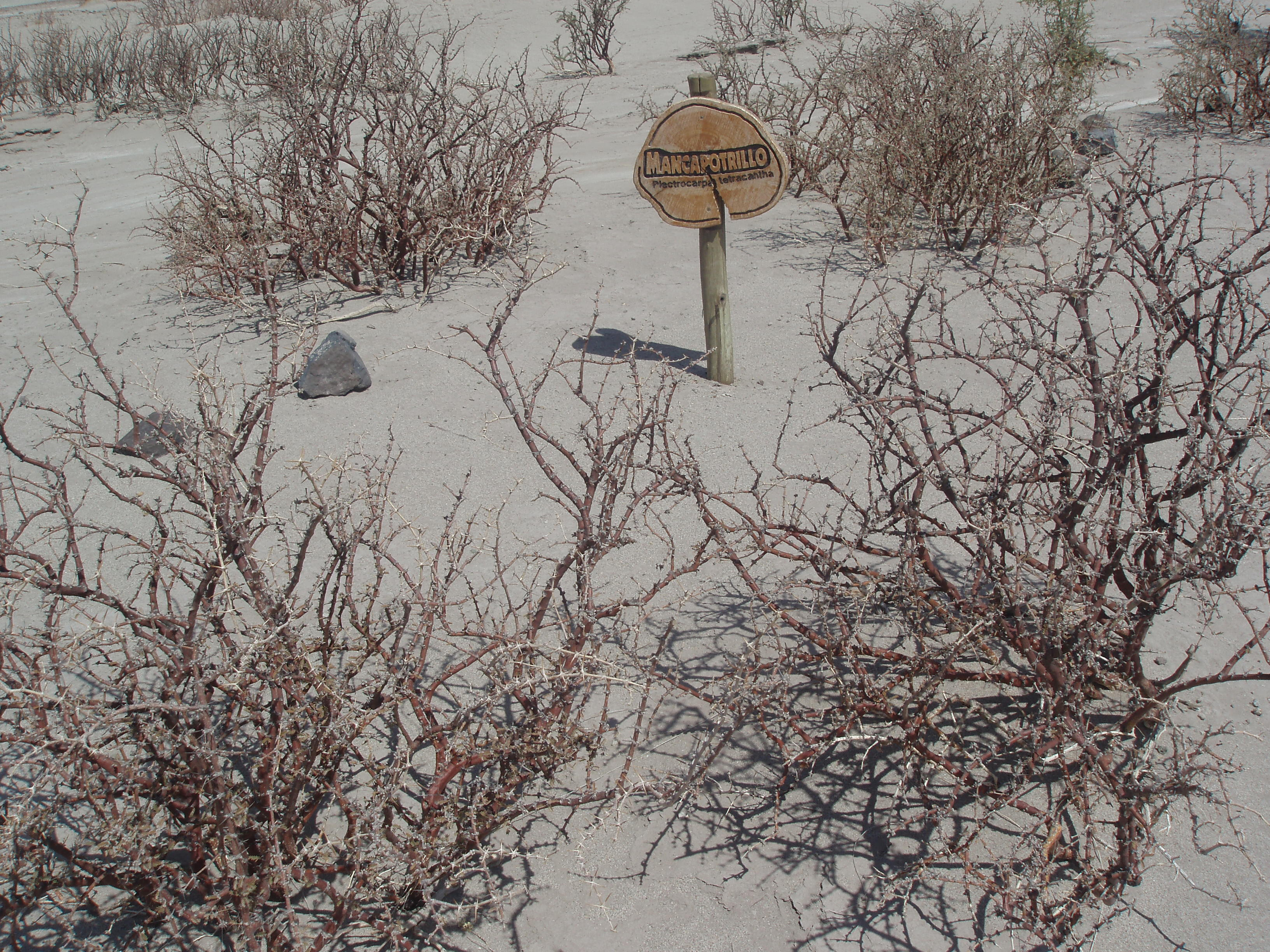
- Plectrocarpa tetracantha

Scientific classification
- Kingdom: Plantae
- Clade: Tracheophytes
- Clade: Angiosperms
- Clade: Eudicots
- Clade: Rosids
- Order: Zygophyllales
- Family: Zygophyllaceae
- Genus: Plectrocarpa; Gillies ex Hook. & Arn.

= Plectrocarpa =

Genus of plants

Plectrocarpa is a genus of flowering plants belonging to the family Zygophyllaceae.

Its native range is Colombia to Venezuela, Bolivia to Western Central Brazil and Northern Argentina.

Species:

- Plectrocarpa arborea (Jacq.) Christenh. & Byng
- Plectrocarpa bonariensis (Griseb.) Christenh. & Byng
- Plectrocarpa carrapo (Killip & Dugand) Christenh. & Byng
- Plectrocarpa rougesii Descole, O'Donell & Lourteig
- Plectrocarpa sarmientoi (Lorentz ex Griseb.) Christenh. & Byng
- Plectrocarpa tetracantha Gillies ex Hook. & Arn.
