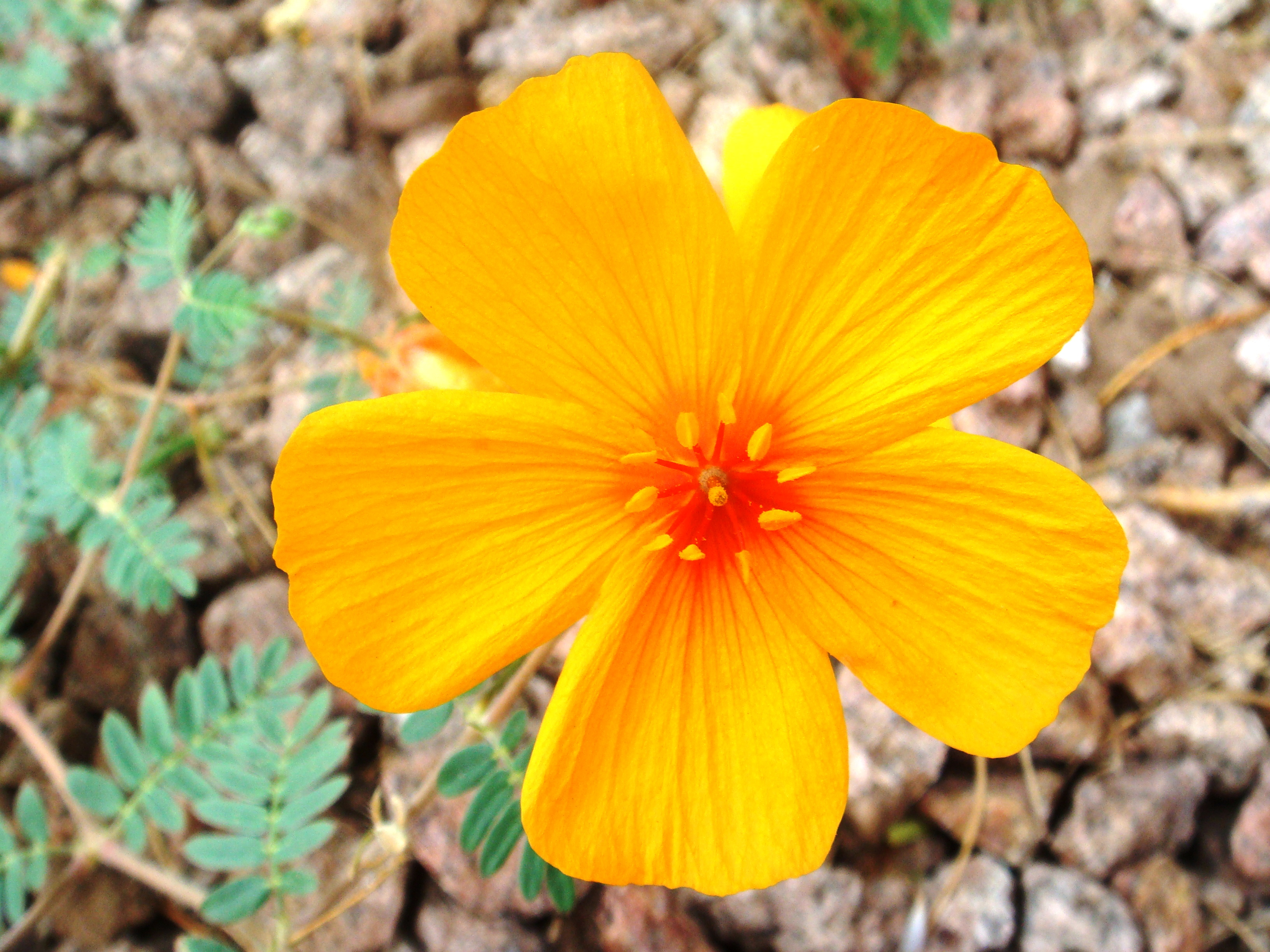
- Kallstroemia grandiflora

Scientific classification
- Kingdom: Plantae
- Clade: Tracheophytes
- Clade: Angiosperms
- Clade: Eudicots
- Clade: Rosids
- Order: Zygophyllales
- Family: Zygophyllaceae
- Subfamily: Tribuloideae
- Genus: Kallstroemia; Scop.

Species
- See text

Synonyms
- Ehrenbergia Mart.; Heterozygis Bunge

= Kallstroemia =

Genus of plants

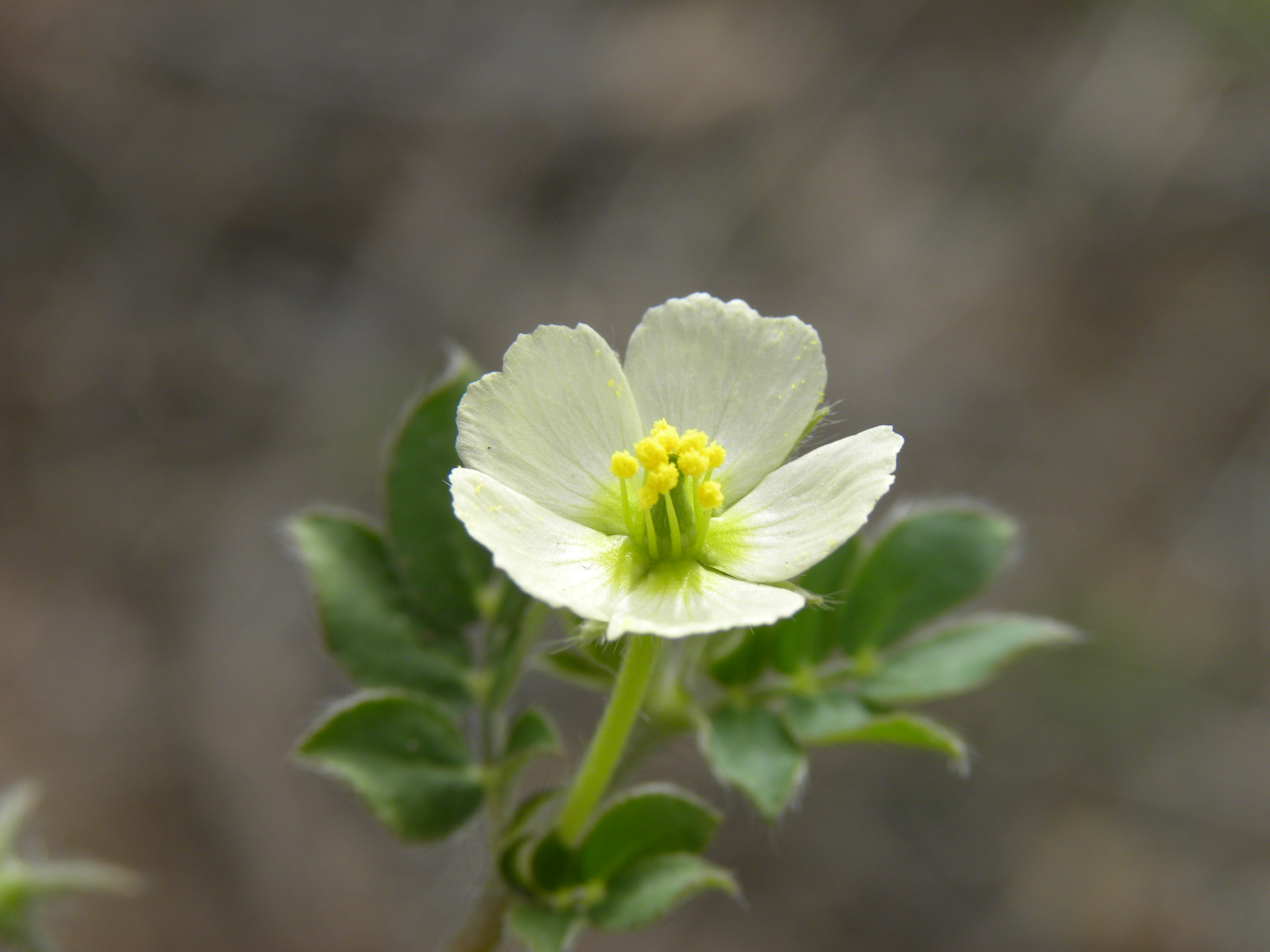
Kallstroemia pubescens

Kallstroemia is a genus of flowering plants in the caltrop family, Zygophyllaceae. The approximately 20 species it contains are native to tropical and warm temperate regions of the Americas. The flower and fruit morphology is similar to Tribulus. The convex fruits separate into about 10 nutlets each with one seed. The genus is named after A. Kallstroem who lived in the 18th century.

== Species ==
There are 20 species assigned to this genus:

- Kallstroemia adscendens (Andersson) B.L.Rob.
- Kallstroemia boliviana Standl.
- Kallstroemia californica (S.Watson) Vail – California caltrop
- Kallstroemia curta Rydb.
- Kallstroemia grandiflora Torr. ex A.Gray – Arizona poppy
- Kallstroemia hageri Rebman
- Kallstroemia hintonii D.M.Porter
- Kallstroemia hirsutissima Vail ex Small – Hairy caltrop
- Kallstroemia incana Rydb.
- Kallstroemia maxima (L.) Hook. & Arn. – Big caltrop
- Kallstroemia parviflora Norton – Warty caltrop
- Kallstroemia peninsularis D.M.Porter
- Kallstroemia pennellii D.M.Porter
- Kallstroemia perennans B.L.Turner – Perennial caltrop
- Kallstroemia porteri B.L.Turner
- Kallstroemia pubescens (G.Don) Dandy – Caribbean caltrop
- Kallstroemia rosei Rydb.
- Kallstroemia standleyi D.M.Porter
- Kallstroemia tribuloides (Mart.) Steud.
- Kallstroemia tucumanensis Descole, O'Donell & Lourteig
