= Melocarpum =

Scientific classification
- Kingdom: Plantae
- Clade: Tracheophytes
- Clade: Angiosperms
- Clade: Eudicots
- Clade: Rosids
- Order: Zygophyllales
- Family: Zygophyllaceae
- Subfamily: Zygophylloideae
- Genus: Melocarpum (Engl.) Beier & Thulin

Genus of plants

Melocarpum is a genus of flowering plants belonging to the family Zygophyllaceae.

Its native range is Ethiopia and Somalia in northeastern tropical Africa and Oman in the southern Arabian Peninsula.

Species:

- Melocarpum hildebrandtii (Engl.) Beier & Thulin
- Melocarpum robecchii (Engl.) Beier & Thulin
