= Sericodes greggii =

Scientific classification
- Kingdom: Plantae
- Clade: Tracheophytes
- Clade: Angiosperms
- Clade: Eudicots
- Clade: Rosids
- Order: Zygophyllales
- Family: Zygophyllaceae
- Genus: Sericodes; A.Gray
- Species: S. greggii

Binomial name
- Sericodes greggii A.Gray

Genus of plants

Sericodes is a monotypic genus of flowering plants belonging to the family Zygophyllaceae. The only species in the genus is Sericodes greggii, which is endemic to northeastern Mexico.
