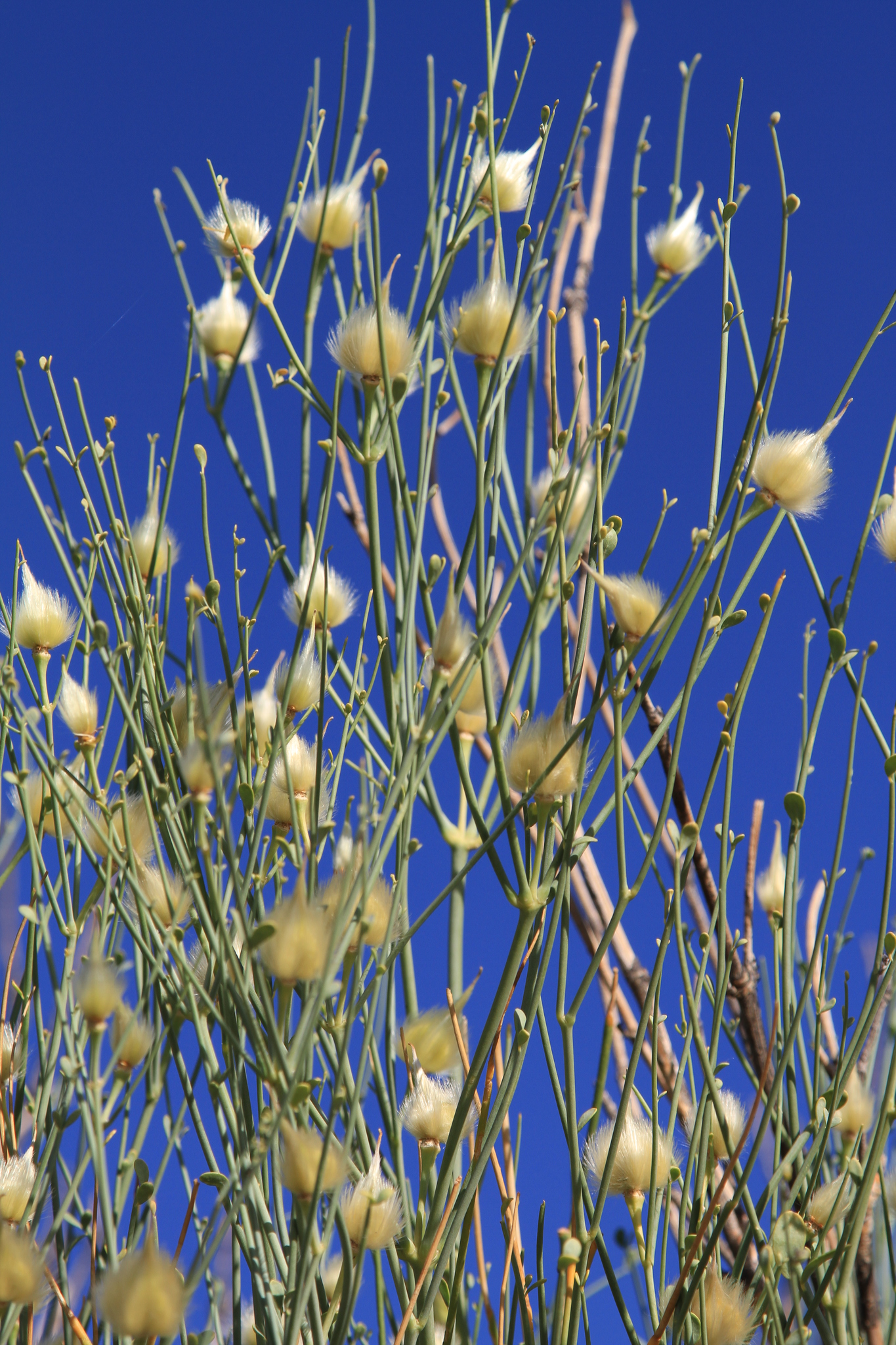

Scientific classification
- Kingdom: Plantae
- Clade: Tracheophytes
- Clade: Angiosperms
- Clade: Eudicots
- Clade: Rosids
- Order: Zygophyllales
- Family: Zygophyllaceae
- Genus: Sisyndite; E.Mey. ex Sond.
- Species: S. spartea

Binomial name
- Sisyndite spartea E.Mey. ex Sond.

= Sisyndite =

Genus of plants

Sisyndite is a genus of flowering plants belonging to the family Zygophyllaceae, containing only one species, Sisyndite spartea. It is a shrub native to southern Namibia and the northern Cape Provinces of South Africa.
