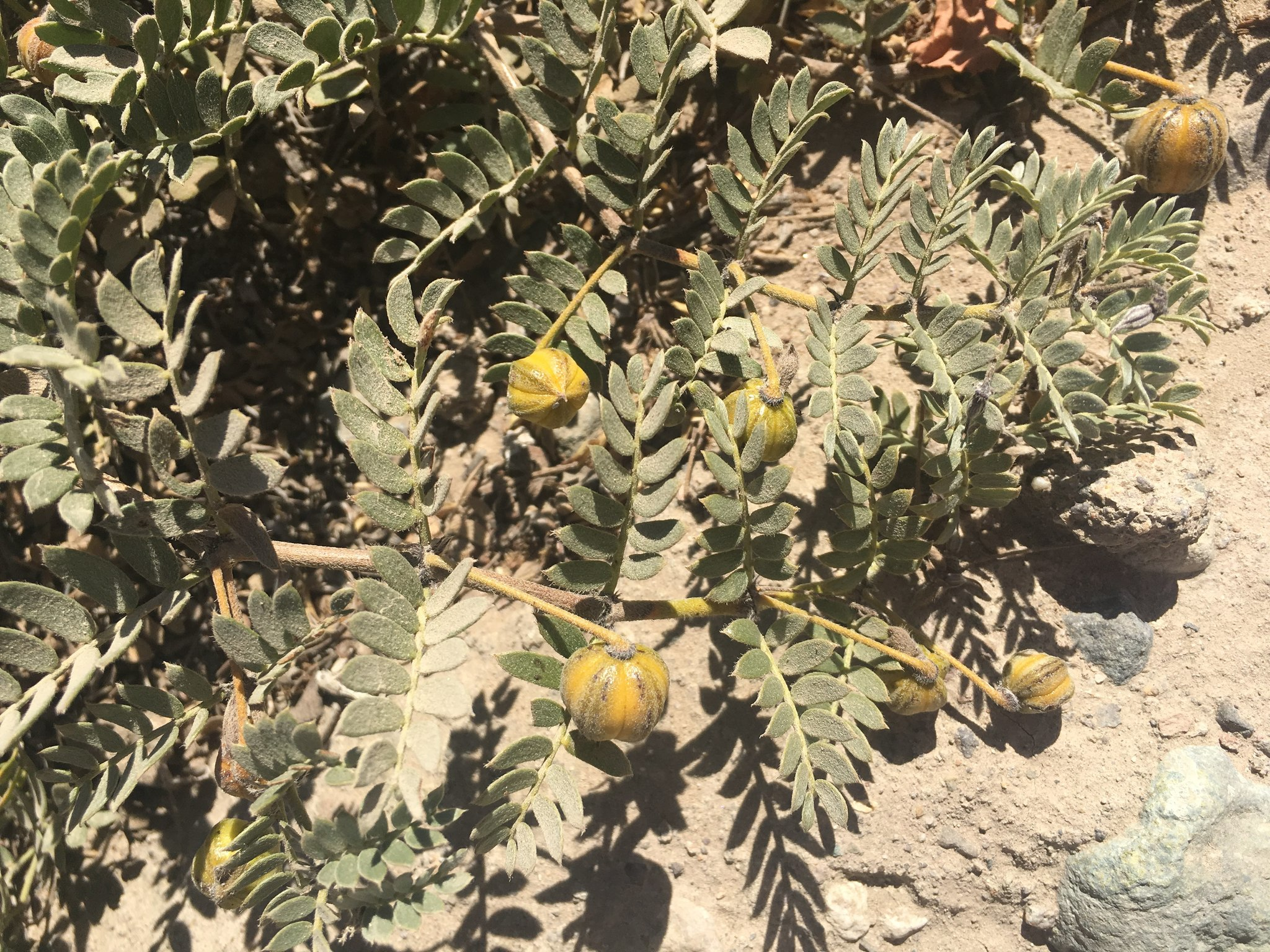
- Pintoa chilensis in Atacama, Chile

Scientific classification
- Kingdom: Plantae
- Clade: Tracheophytes
- Clade: Angiosperms
- Clade: Eudicots
- Clade: Rosids
- Order: Zygophyllales
- Family: Zygophyllaceae
- Genus: Pintoa; Gay
- Species: P. chilensis

Binomial name
- Pintoa chilensis Gay

Synonyms
- Pintoa chilensis var. eglandulosa Phil.; Pintoa chilensis var. glandulosa Phil.; Pintoa chilensis var. microphylla Phil.

= Pintoa chilensis =

Species of flowering plant

Pintoa is a monotypic genus of flowering plants belonging to the family Zygophyllaceae. It only contains one known species, Pintoa chilensis, a shrub endemic to Chile.

== Distribution and habitat ==
Pintoa chilensis inhabits the desert landscape in the Atacama Region of Northern Chile.

== History ==
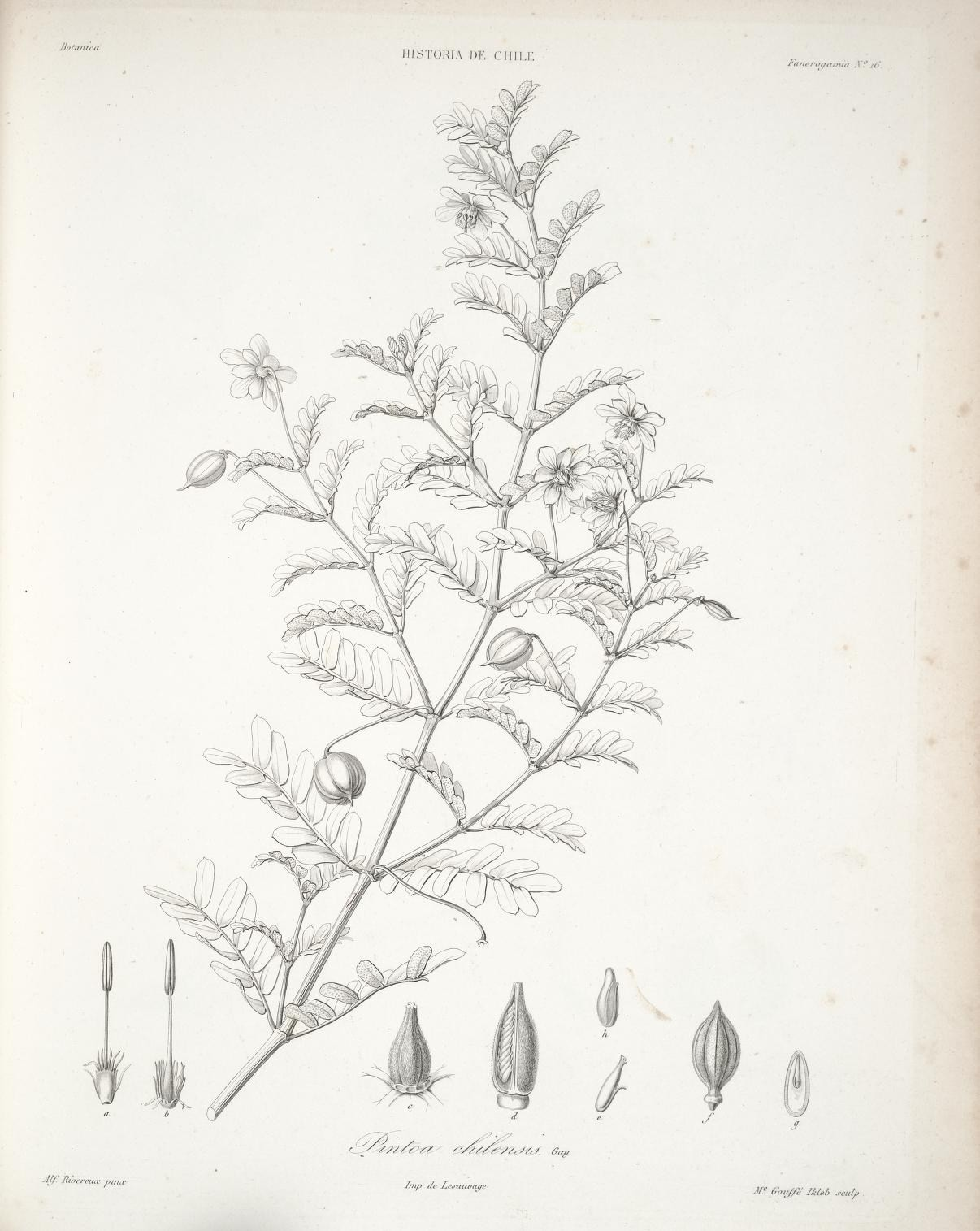
Botanical illustration by Claudio Gay, 1854

The genus name of Pintoa is in honour of Francisco Antonio Pinto (1785–1858), a Chilean politician who served as President of Chile between 1827 and 1829. The Latin specific epithet of chilensis means "coming from Chile", where the plant was found. Both the genus and the species were first described and published in Fl. Chil. Vol.1 on page 479 in 1846.
