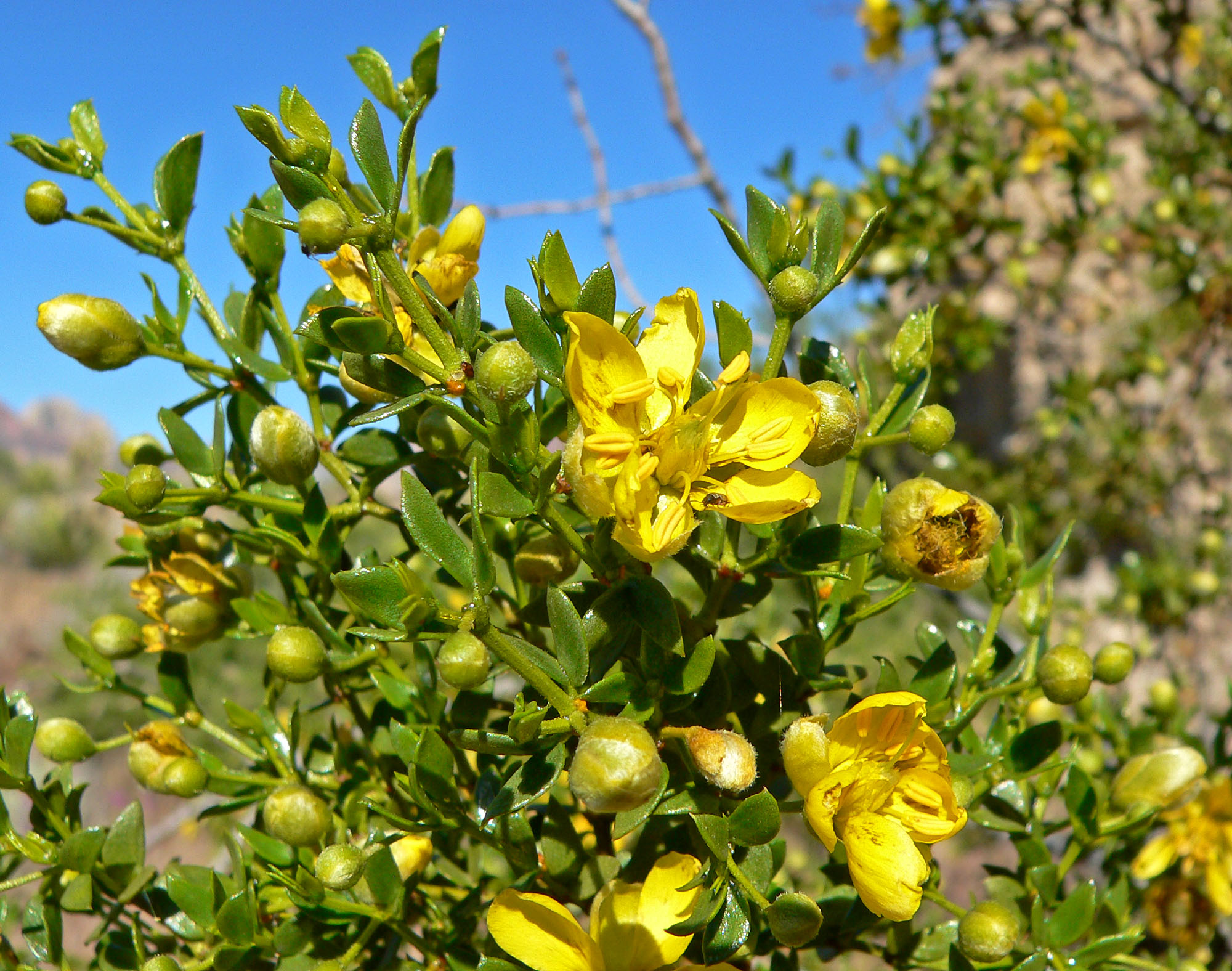
- Larrea tridentata

Scientific classification
- Kingdom: Plantae
- Clade: Tracheophytes
- Clade: Angiosperms
- Clade: Eudicots
- Clade: Rosids
- Order: Zygophyllales
- Family: Zygophyllaceae; R.Br.

Subfamilies
- Larreoideae; Morkillioideae; Seetzenioideae; Tribuloideae; Zygophylloideae

Synonyms
- Balanitaceae Endl. (1841); Krameriaceae Dumort. (1829) (optional synonym); Tribulaceae Trautv. (1853)

= Zygophyllaceae =

Family of flowering plants

Zygophyllaceae is a family of flowering plants that contains the bean-caper and caltrop. The family includes around 285 species in 22 genera.

Plants in the family Zygophyllaceae may be trees, shrubs, or herbs. They are often found in dry habitats. The leaves are usually opposite, often with stipules and spines. Some are cultivated as ornamental plants, such as species of the Guaiacum, Zygophyllum, Tribulus, and Larrea genera. King Clone, a creosote bush (Larrea tridentata) in California, is among the world's oldest documented living organisms.

The distribution of plants in the Zygophyllaceae family can be found worldwide in warm tropics and cool-temperate subtropics with a concentration in hot, arid regions with alkaline soils. Regions with different species from this family include Africa, south Asia, India, Australia and parts of the United States.

== Genera ==
Subfamily Larreoideae

- Bulnesia Gay
- Guaiacum L.
- Larrea Cav.
- Pintoa Gay
- Porlieria Ruiz & Pav.

Subfamily Morkillioideae

- Morkillia Rose & J.H.Painter
- Sericodes A.Gray
- Viscainoa Greene

Subfamily Seetzenioideae

- Seetzenia R.Br. ex Decne.

Subfamily Tribuloideae

- Balanites Delile
- Kallstroemia Scop.
- Kelleronia Schinz
- Neoluederitzia Schinz
- Sisyndite E.Mey. ex Sond.
- Tribulopis R.Br.
- Tribulus L.

Subfamily Zygophylloideae

- Augea Thunb. – synonym of Zygophyllum
- Fagonia L. – synonym of Zygophyllum
- Melocarpum (Engl.) Beier & Thulin
- Miltianthus Bunge
- Roepera A.Juss.
- Tetraena Maxim. – synonym of Zygophyllum
- Zygophyllum L.

Unplaced

- Metharme Phil. ex Engl.
- Plectrocarpa Gillies ex Hook. & Arn.

Peganum was in Zygophyllaceae before being moved to the newly created family Nitrariaceae.

== Systematics ==
In the APG III system of classification, the families Zygophyllaceae and Krameriaceae compose the order Zygophyllales. In the previous version of their classification system, the Angiosperm Phylogeny Group had included the option of placing Krameria within Zygophyllaceae.

Zygophyllaceae are divided into five subfamilies. Molecular phylogenies of the family were published in 2000 and 2018. Phylogenies of groups within the family, particularly the predominantly southern African species of Zygophylloideae have also been published.

Modern molecular phylogenetics suggest the following relationships:

- Zygophyllales
  - Krameriaceae (outgroup)
  - Zygophyllaceae
    - - Morkillioideae
        - Sericodes
        - - Viscainoa
          - Morkillia
      - Tribuloideae
        - Sisyndite
        - - Neoluederitzia
          - - Balanites
            - - Kallstroemia
              - - Tribulopis
                - - Kelleronia
                  - Tribulus
    - - Seetzenioideae
        Seetzenia
      - - Larreoideae
          - Guaiacum
          - - Porlieria
            - - Bulnesia
              - - Pintoa
                - Larrea
        - Zygophylloideae
          - Tetraena
          - - Zygophyllum sensu stricto
            - - Roepera
              - - Augea
                - - Melocarpum
                  - Fagonia
