= List of Zygophyllales of South Africa =

Flowering plants in the order Zygophyllales recorded from South Africa

Zygophyllales is an order of dicotyledonous flowering plants. The anthophytes are a grouping of plant taxa bearing flower-like reproductive structures. They were formerly thought to be a clade comprising plants bearing flower-like structures. The group contained the angiosperms - the extant flowering plants, such as roses and grasses - as well as the Gnetales and the extinct Bennettitales.

23,420 species of vascular plant have been recorded in South Africa, making it the sixth most species-rich country in the world and the most species-rich country on the African continent. Of these, 153 species are considered to be threatened. Nine biomes have been described in South Africa: Fynbos, Succulent Karoo, desert, Nama Karoo, grassland, savanna, Albany thickets, the Indian Ocean coastal belt, and forests.

The 2018 South African National Biodiversity Institute's National Biodiversity Assessment plant checklist lists 35,130 taxa in the phyla Anthocerotophyta (hornworts (6)), Anthophyta (flowering plants (33534)), Bryophyta (mosses (685)), Cycadophyta (cycads (42)), Lycopodiophyta (Lycophytes(45)), Marchantiophyta (liverworts (376)), Pinophyta (conifers (33)), and Pteridophyta (cryptogams (408)).

One family is represented in the literature. Listed taxa include species, subspecies, varieties, and forms as recorded, some of which have subsequently been allocated to other taxa as synonyms, in which cases the accepted taxon is appended to the listing. Multiple entries under alternative names reflect taxonomic revision over time.

== Zygophyllaceae ==
Family: Zygophyllaceae,

=== Augea ===
Genus Augea:

- Augea capensis Thunb. indigenous, indigenous

=== Balanites ===
Genus Balanites:

- Balanites maughamii Sprague, indigenous, indigenous
  - Balanites maughamii Sprague subsp. Maughamii indigenous, indigenous
- Balanites pedicellaris Mildbr. & Schltr. Indigenous, indigenous, indigenous
  - Balanites pedicellaris Mildbr. & Schltr. subsp. Pedicellaris, indigenous, indigenous
- Balanites welwitschii (Tiegh.) Exell & Mendonça, accepted as Balanites angolensis (Welw.) Welw. ex Mildbr. & Schltr. subsp. welwitschii (Tiegh.) Sands

=== Fagonia ===
Genus Fagonia:

- Fagonia capensis Hadidi, indigenous, indigenous
- Fagonia isotricha Murb. Indigenous, indigenous
  - Fagonia isotricha Murb. var. isotricha, indigenous

=== Roepera ===
Genus Roepera:

- Roepera botulifolia (Van Zyl) Beier & Thulin, indigenous
- Roepera cordifolia (L.f.) Beier & Thulin, indigenous
- Roepera cuneifolia (Eckl. & Zeyh.) Beier & Thulin, indigenous
- Roepera debilis (Cham.) Beier & Thulin, indigenous
- Roepera divaricata (Eckl. & Zeyh.) Beier & Thulin, indigenous
- Roepera flexuosa (Eckl. & Zeyh.) Beier & Thulin, indigenous
- Roepera foetida (Schrad. & J.C.Wendl.) Beier & Thulin, indigenous
- Roepera fulva (L.) Beier & Thulin, indigenous
- Roepera fuscata (Van Zyl) Beier & Thulin, indigenous
- Roepera horrida (Cham.) Beier & Thulin, indigenous
- Roepera incrustata (Sond.) Beier & Thulin, indigenous
- Roepera leptopetala (Sond.) Beier & Thulin, indigenous
- Roepera leucoclada (Diels) Beier & Thulin, indigenous
- Roepera lichtensteiniana (Cham.) Beier & Thulin, indigenous
- Roepera macrocarpon (Retief) Beier & Thulin, indigenous
- Roepera maculata (Aiton) Beier & Thulin, indigenous
- Roepera maritima (Eckl. & Zeyh.) Beier & Thulin, indigenous
- Roepera microphyllum (L.f.) Beier & Thulin, indigenous
- Roepera morgsana (L.) Beier & Thulin, indigenous
- Roepera pubescens (Schinz) Beier & Thulin, indigenous
- Roepera pygmaea (Eckl. & Zeyh.) Beier & Thulin, indigenous
- Roepera rogersii (Compton) Beier & Thulin, indigenous
- Roepera schreiberi (Merxm. & Giess) Beier & Thulin, indigenous
- Roepera sessilifolia (L.) Beier & Thulin, indigenous
- Roepera sphaerocarpa (Schltr. ex Huysst.) Beier & Thulin, indigenous
- Roepera spinosa (L.) Beier & Thulin, indigenous
- Roepera teretifolia (Schltr.) Beier & Thulin, indigenous

=== Seetzenia ===
Genus Seetzenia:

- Seetzenia lanata (Willd.) Bullock, indigenous

=== Sisyndite ===
Genus Sisyndite:

- Sisyndite spartea E.Mey. ex Sond. indigenous

=== Tetraena ===
Genus Tetraena:

- Tetraena chrysopteron (Retief) Beier & Thulin, indigenous
- Tetraena clavata (Schltr. & Diels) Beier & Thulin, indigenous
- Tetraena decumbens (Delile) Beier & Thulin, indigenous
- Tetraena microcarpa (Licht. ex Cham.) Beier & Thulin, indigenous
- Tetraena prismatocarpa (Sond.) Beier & Thulin, indigenous
- Tetraena pterocaulis (Van Zyl) Beier & Thulin, indigenous
- Tetraena retrofracta (Thunb.) Beier & Thulin, indigenous
- Tetraena rigida (Schinz) Beier & Thulin, indigenous
- Tetraena simplex (L.) Beier & Thulin, indigenous
- Tetraena tenuis (Glover) Beier & Thulin, indigenous

=== Tribulus ===
Genus Tribulus:

- Tribulus cristatus C.Presl, indigenous
- Tribulus pterophorus C.Presl, indigenous
- Tribulus terrestris L. indigenous
- Tribulus zeyheri Sond. indigenous
  - Tribulus zeyheri Sond. subsp. zeyheri, indigenous

=== Zygophyllum ===
Genus Zygophyllum:

- Zygophyllum botulifolium van Zyl, accepted as Roepera botulifolia (Van Zyl) Beier & Thulin, endemic
- Zygophyllum campanulatum Dinter ex Range, accepted as Tetraena longicapsularis (Schinz) Beier & Thulin
- Zygophyllum chrysopteron Retief, accepted as Tetraena chrysopteron (Retief) Beier & Thulin, indigenous
- Zygophyllum cinereum Schinz, accepted as Tetraena longicapsularis (Schinz) Beier & Thulin
- Zygophyllum clavatum Schltr. & Diels, accepted as Tetraena clavata (Schltr. & Diels) Beier & Thulin, indigenous
- Zygophyllum cordifolium L.f. accepted as Roepera cordifolia (L.f.) Beier & Thulin, indigenous
- Zygophyllum crassifolium Schltr. ex Huysst. accepted as Roepera cuneifolia (Eckl. & Zeyh.) Beier & Thulin
- Zygophyllum cuneifolium Eckl. & Zeyh. accepted as Roepera cuneifolia (Eckl. & Zeyh.) Beier & Thulin, endemic
- Zygophyllum debile Cham. & Schltdl. accepted as Roepera debilis (Cham.) Beier & Thulin, endemic
- Zygophyllum decumbens Delile, accepted as Tetraena decumbens (Delile) Beier & Thulin, present
- Zygophyllum densiflorum Schinz, accepted as Zygophyllum dregeanum Sond.
- Zygophyllum dichotomum Cham. & Schltdl. endemic
- Zygophyllum divaricatum Eckl. & Zeyh. accepted as Roepera divaricata (Eckl. & Zeyh.) Beier & Thulin, endemic
- Zygophyllum dregeanum Sond. indigenous
- Zygophyllum flexuosum Eckl. & Zeyh. accepted as Roepera flexuosa (Eckl. & Zeyh.) Beier & Thulin, endemic
- Zygophyllum foetidum Schrad. & J.C.Wendl. accepted as Roepera foetida (Schrad. & J.C.Wendl.) Beier & Thulin, endemic
- Zygophyllum fulvum L. accepted as Roepera fulva (L.) Beier & Thulin, endemic
- Zygophyllum fuscatum van Zyl, accepted as Roepera fuscata (Van Zyl) Beier & Thulin, endemic
- Zygophyllum garipense E.Mey. accepted as Tetraena microcarpa (Licht. ex Cham.) Beier & Thulin
- Zygophyllum gilfillanii N.E.Br. accepted as Roepera lichtensteiniana (Cham.) Beier & Thulin, present
- Zygophyllum glaucum E.Mey. ex Sond. indigenous
- Zygophyllum horridum Cham. accepted as Roepera horrida (Cham.) Beier & Thulin, indigenous
- Zygophyllum incanum Schinz, accepted as Tetraena longistipula (Schinz) Beier & Thulin
- Zygophyllum incrustatum E.Mey. ex Sond. accepted as Roepera incrustata (Sond.) Beier & Thulin, endemic
- Zygophyllum latialatum Engl. accepted as Tetraena rigida (Schinz) Beier & Thulin
- Zygophyllum leptopetalum E.Mey. ex Sond. accepted as Roepera leptopetala (Sond.) Beier & Thulin, indigenous
- Zygophyllum leucocladum Diels, accepted as Roepera leucoclada (Diels) Beier & Thulin, indigenous
- Zygophyllum lichtensteinianum Cham. & Schltdl. accepted as Roepera lichtensteiniana (Cham.) Beier & Thulin, endemic
- Zygophyllum longicapsulare Schinz, accepted as Tetraena longicapsularis (Schinz) Beier & Thulin, indigenous
- Zygophyllum longistipulatum Schinz, accepted as Tetraena longistipula (Schinz) Beier & Thulin
- Zygophyllum macrocarpon Retief, accepted as Roepera macrocarpon (Retief) Beier & Thulin, indigenous
- Zygophyllum maculatum Aiton, accepted as Roepera maculata (Aiton) Beier & Thulin, endemic
- Zygophyllum maritimum Eckl. & Zeyh. accepted as Roepera maritima (Eckl. & Zeyh.) Beier & Thulin, endemic
- Zygophyllum maximiliani Schltr. ex Huysst. indigenous
- Zygophyllum meyeri Sond. accepted as Roepera foetida (Schrad. & J.C.Wendl.) Beier & Thulin, present
- Zygophyllum microcarpum Licht. ex Cham. & Schltdl. accepted as Tetraena microcarpa (Licht. ex Cham.) Beier & Thulin, indigenous
- Zygophyllum microphyllum L.f. accepted as Roepera microphyllum (L.f.) Beier & Thulin, indigenous
- Zygophyllum morgsana L. accepted as Roepera morgsana (L.) Beier & Thulin, indigenous
- Zygophyllum paradoxum Schinz, accepted as Roepera cordifolia (L.f.) Beier & Thulin
- Zygophyllum pfeilii Engl. accepted as Roepera cordifolia (L.f.) Beier & Thulin
- Zygophyllum prismatocarpum E.Mey. ex Sond. accepted as Tetraena prismatocarpa (Sond.) Beier & Thulin, indigenous
- Zygophyllum procumbens Adamson, accepted as Roepera spinosa (L.) Beier & Thulin, present
- Zygophyllum pterocaule van Zyl, accepted as Tetraena pterocaulis (Van Zyl) Beier & Thulin, indigenous
- Zygophyllum pubescens Schinz, accepted as Roepera pubescens (Schinz) Beier & Thulin, indigenous
- Zygophyllum pygmaeum Eckl. & Zeyh. accepted as Roepera pygmaea (Eckl. & Zeyh.) Beier & Thulin, endemic
- Zygophyllum retrofractum Thunb. accepted as Tetraena retrofracta (Thunb.) Beier & Thulin, indigenous
- Zygophyllum rigidum B.D.Jacks. accepted as Balanites roxburghii Planch. present
- Zygophyllum rigidum Schinz, accepted as Tetraena rigida (Schinz) Beier & Thulin, indigenous
- Zygophyllum rogersii Compton, accepted as Roepera rogersii (Compton) Beier & Thulin, endemic
- Zygophyllum schaeferi Engl. accepted as Roepera cordifolia (L.f.) Beier & Thulin
- Zygophyllum schreiberanum Merxm. & Giess, accepted as Roepera schreiberi (Merxm. & Giess) Beier & Thulin
- Zygophyllum sessilifolium L. accepted as Roepera sessilifolia (L.) Beier & Thulin, endemic
- Zygophyllum simplex L. accepted as Tetraena simplex (L.) Beier & Thulin, indigenous
- Zygophyllum sonderi H.Eichler, indigenous
- Zygophyllum sphaerocarpum Schltr. ex Huysst. accepted as Roepera sphaerocarpa (Schltr. ex Huysst.) Beier & Thulin, indigenous
- Zygophyllum spinosum L. accepted as Roepera spinosa (L.) Beier & Thulin, endemic
- Zygophyllum suffruticosum Schinz, accepted as Tetraena rigida (Schinz) Beier & Thulin, present
- Zygophyllum sulcatum Huysst. accepted as Roepera leucoclada (Diels) Beier & Thulin
- Zygophyllum tenue P.E.Glover, accepted as Tetraena tenuis (Glover) Beier & Thulin, indigenous
- Zygophyllum teretifolium Schltr. accepted as Roepera teretifolia (Schltr.) Beier & Thulin, endemic
- Zygophyllum trothai Diels, accepted as Tetraena rigida (Schinz) Beier & Thulin
- Zygophyllum uitenhagense Sond. accepted as Roepera maritima (Eckl. & Zeyh.) Beier & Thulin, present
