= Tetraena =

Formerly accepted genus of flowering plants

Tetraena is a possible genus of flowering plants in the family Zygophyllaceae, subfamily Zygophylloideae. As of January 2025, Plants of the World Online and the World Flora Online accepted it as a synonym of Zygophyllum.

== Description ==
Species formerly placed in Tetraena are shrubby or herbaceous, the tallest being around 1.5 m (4.9 ft). The leaves are opposite, or sometimes borne on short shoots and then appearing to be alternate. They may or may not have stalks (petioles). The flower usually has five petals and five sepals, rarely four, and ten stamens. The flower is usually tube-like in appearance with white to pale orange petals. The ovary has three to five chambers (locules). The ripe fruit is variable in shape, splitting into parts before releasing the seeds.

== Taxonomy ==
The genus Tetraena was erected by Karl Maximovich in 1889 for the species Tetraena mongolica (syn. Zygophyllum mongolicum). Until 2003, this was the only species recognized in the genus. Molecular phylogenetic studies suggested that the genus Zygophyllum was not monophyletic, since Tetraena and some other genera were nested within it. To create monophyletic genera, Björn-Axel Beier and Mats Thulin transferred about 40 species of Zygophyllum to Tetraena, creating a much expanded genus. Doubt was later cast on whether this was the right approach to achieving a monophyletic Zygophyllum. As of January 2025, Plants of the World Online and the World Flora Online placed Tetraena within Zygophyllum, although Tetraena was accepted by other sources.

== Former species ==
Species that have been placed in Tetraena and were placed in Zygophyllum by Plants of the World Online as of February 2025, include:

- Tetraena aegyptia (Hosny) Beier & Thulin = Zygophyllum aegyptium
- Tetraena alba (L.f.) Beier & Thulin = Zygophyllum album
- Tetraena applanata (Van Zyl) Beier & Thulin = Zygophyllum applanatum
- Tetraena bucharica (B.Fedtsch.) Beier & Thulin = Zygophyllum bucharicum
- Tetraena chrysopteros (Retief) Beier & Thulin = Zygophyllum chrysopteron
- Tetraena clavata (Schltr. & Diels) Beier & Thulin = Zygophyllum clavatum
- Tetraena coccinea (L.) Beier & Thulin = Zygophyllum coccineum
- Tetraena cornuta (Coss.) Beier & Thulin = Zygophyllum cornutum
- Tetraena cylindrifolia (Schinz) Beier & Thulin = Zygophyllum cylindrifolium
- Tetraena decumbens (Delile) Beier & Thulin = Zygophyllum decumbens
- Tetraena dumosa (Boiss.) Beier & Thulin = Zygophyllum dumosum
- Tetraena fontanesii (Webb & Berthel.) Beier & Thulin = Zygophyllum fontanesii
- Tetraena gaetula (Emb. & Maire) Beier & Thulin = Zygophyllum gaetulum
- Tetraena geslinii (Coss.) Beier & Thulin = Zygophyllum geslinii
- Tetraena giessii (Merxm. & A.Schreib.) Beier & Thulin = Zygophyllum giessii
- Tetraena hamiensis (Schweinf.) Beier & Thulin = Zygophyllum hamiense
- Tetraena longicapsularis (Schinz) Beier & Thulin = Zygophyllum longicapsulare
- Tetraena longistipulata (Schinz) Beier & Thulin = Zygophyllum longistipulatum
- Tetraena madagascariensis (Baill.) Beier & Thulin = Zygophyllum madagascariense
- Tetraena madecassa (H.Perrier) Beier & Thulin = Zygophyllum madecassum
- Tetraena mandavillei (Hadidi) Beier & Thulin = Zygophyllum mandavillei
- Tetraena microcarpa (Licht. ex Cham.) Beier & Thulin = Zygophyllum microcarpum
- Tetraena migiurtinorum (Chiov.) Beier & Thulin = Zygophyllum migiurtinorum
- Tetraena mongolica Maxim. = Zygophyllum mongolicum
- Tetraena prismatica (Chiov.) Beier & Thulin = Zygophyllum prismaticum
- Tetraena prismatocarpa (Sond.) Beier & Thulin = Zygophyllum prismatocarpum
- Tetraena propinqua (Decne.) Ghaz. & Osborne = Zygophyllum propinquum
- Tetraena pterocaulis (Van Zyl) Beier & Thulin = Zygophyllum pterocaule
- Tetraena qatarensis (Hadidi) Beier & Thulin = Zygophyllum qatarense
- Tetraena retrofracta (Thunb.) Beier & Thulin = Zygophyllum retrofractum
- Tetraena rigida (Schinz) Beier & Thulin = Zygophyllum rigidum
- Tetraena simplex (L.) Beier & Thulin = Zygophyllum simplex
- Tetraena somalensis (Hadidi) Beier & Thulin = Zygophyllum somalense
- Tetraena stapffii (Schinz) Beier & Thulin = Zygophyllum stapffii
- Tetraena tenuis (R.Glover) Beier & Thulin = Zygophyllum tenue
