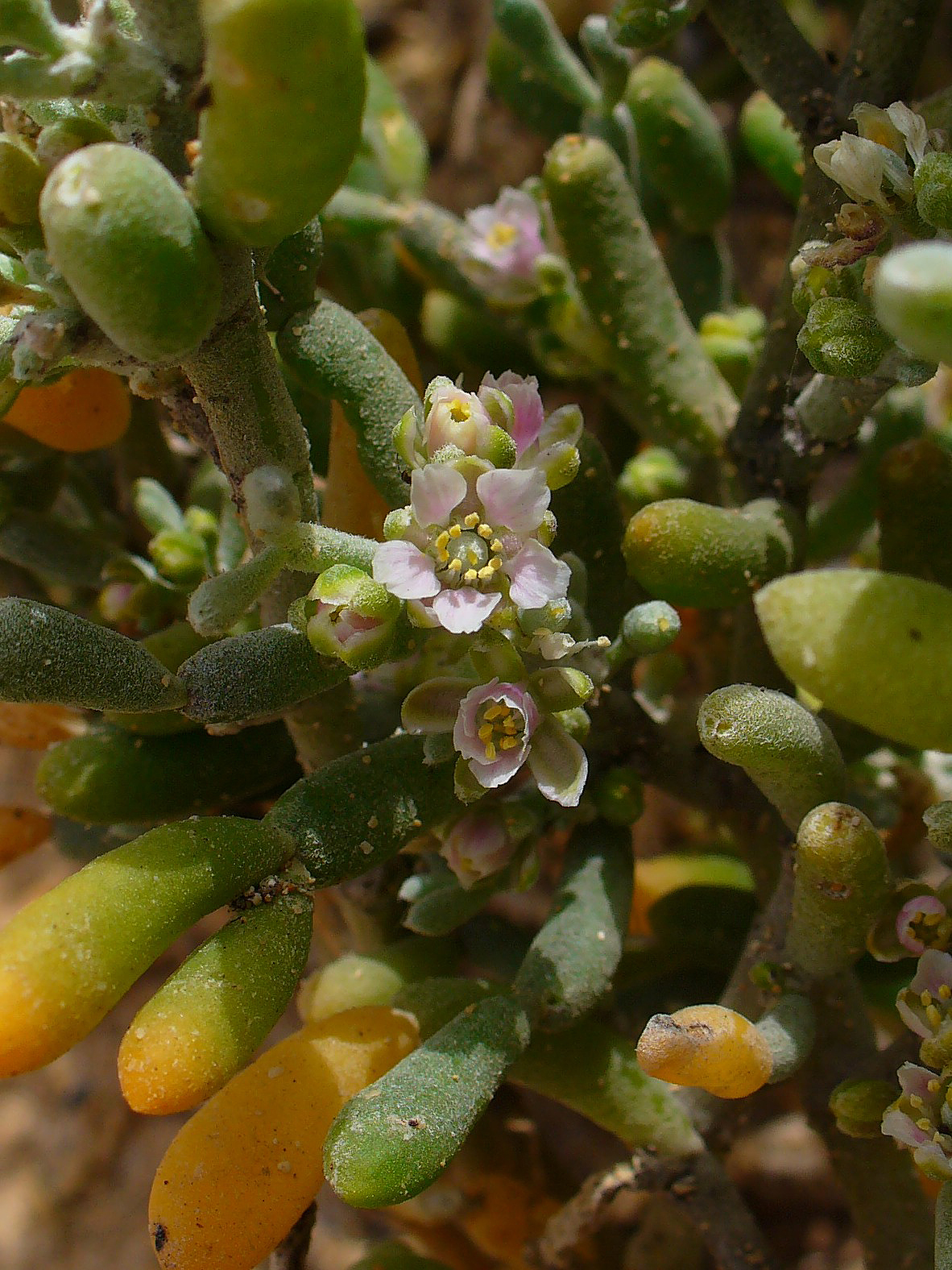
- Zygophyllum fontanesii

Scientific classification
- Kingdom: Plantae
- Clade: Tracheophytes
- Clade: Angiosperms
- Clade: Eudicots
- Clade: Rosids
- Order: Zygophyllales
- Family: Zygophyllaceae
- Subfamily: Zygophylloideae (R.Br.) Arn.

Genera
- See text.

= Zygophylloideae =

Subfamily of plants

Zygophylloideae is a subfamily of the family Zygophyllaceae. The subfamily comprises about 180 species of shrubs, subshrubs and herbs, found throughout arid parts of the Palaeotropics and into North and South America. As of February 2025, the division of the subfamily into genera is disputed, with between four and seven genera accepted by different sources.

== Taxonomy ==
Molecular phylogenetic studies from 2000 onwards have repeatedly strongly supported the monophyly of the subfamily Zygophylloideae. However, the division of the subfamily into genera remains disputed, as of February 2025. A study in 2000 showed that the genus Zygophyllum, as then circumscribed, was polyphyletic, with Augea, Fagonia and Tetraena embedded within it. One response to this, published in 2018, was to expand Zygophyllum to include these three genera. As of February 2025, both Plants of the World Online and the World Flora Online synonymize Augea, Fagonia and Tetraena with Zygophyllum, but retain Melocarpum and Miltianthus.

An alternative proposed in 2003 is to recognize six monophyletic genera (Augea, Fagonia, Melocarpum, Roepera, Tetraena, and Zygophyllum). A cladogram supporting this proposal is shown below.

- Zygophylloideae
  - Roepera
  - - Zygophyllum (includes Miltianthus)
    - - Tetraena
      - - Augea
        - - Fagonia
          - Melocarpum

Sheahan in 2006 did not fully support the recognition of six genera within the Zygophylloideae. He accepted Tetraena only as a monotypic genus endemic to Inner Mongolia, and did not accept Roepera. A 2008 study recognized neither Roepera nor Tetraena. Its preferred cladogram is shown below.

- Zygophylloideae
  - - Melocarpum
    - Fagonia
  - - Augea + Zygophyllum orbiculatum (syn. Roepera orbiculata)
    - Zygophyllum (in two subgenera)

=== Genera ===
Some alternative divisions of Zygophylloideae into genera
Genus	Beier et al. (2003)	Bellstedt et al. (2008)	PoWO & WFO (2025)
Augea Thunb.	accepted	accepted	=Zygophyllum
Fagonia L.	accepted	accepted	=Zygophyllum
Melocarpum (Engl.) Beier & Thulin	accepted	accepted	accepted
Miltianthus Bunge	=Zygophyllum	not included in study	accepted
Roepera A.Juss.	accepted	=Zygophyllum	accepted
Tetraena Maxim.	accepted	=Zygophyllum	=Zygophyllum
Zygophyllum L.	accepted	accepted	accepted

== Distribution and habitat ==
Members of the subfamily Zygophylloideae are generally adapted to arid conditions. They are found in dry or desert areas throughout the Palaeotropics, including Asia, northern Africa and Arabia, southwestern Africa, and Australia. In the broad circumscription used by, for example, Plants of the World Online, the genus Zygophyllum extends into North and South America.

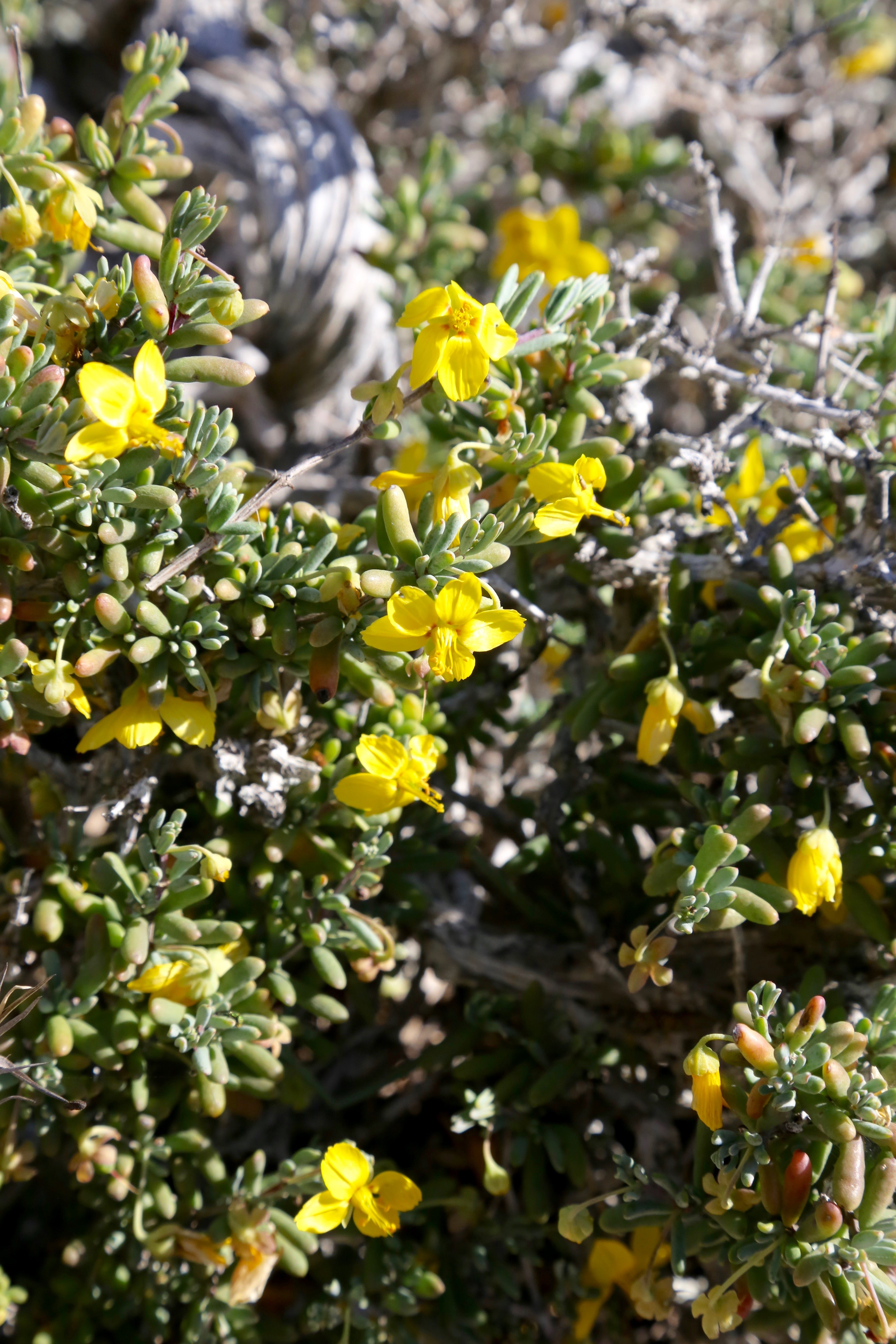
Roepera spinosa, coastline of Namaqua National Park

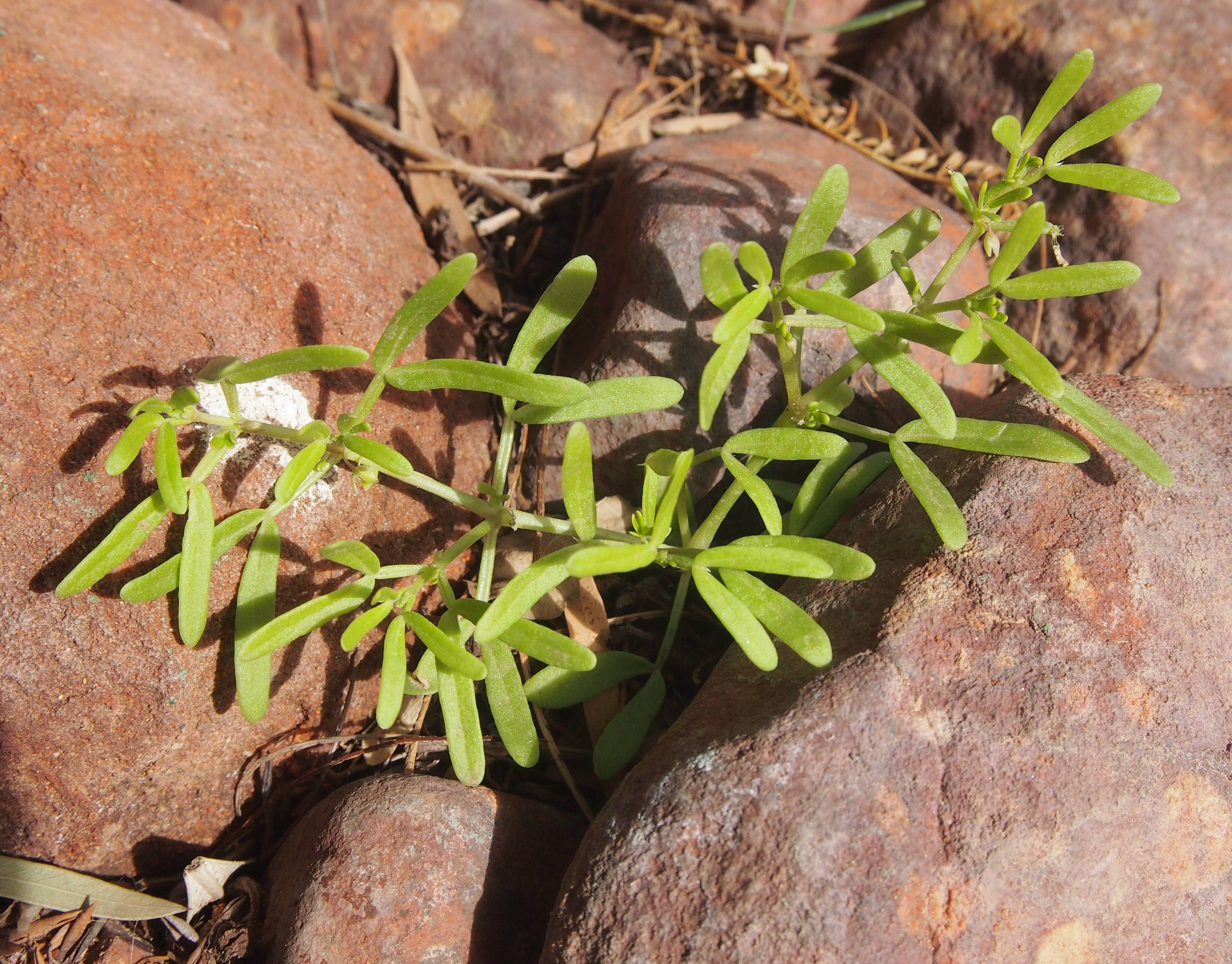
Roepera ammophila, Australia

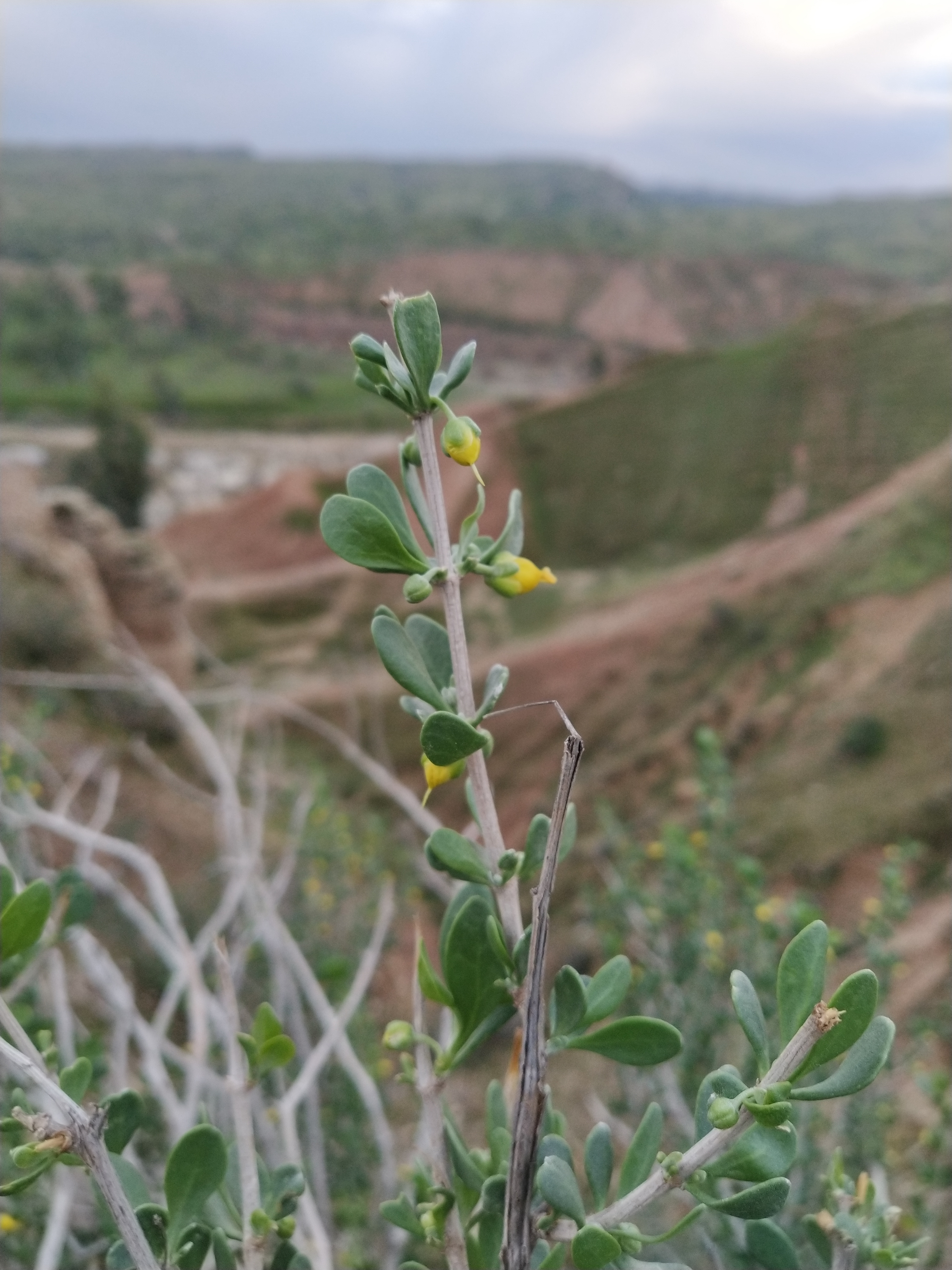
Zygophyllum atriplicoides, Behbahan, Iran

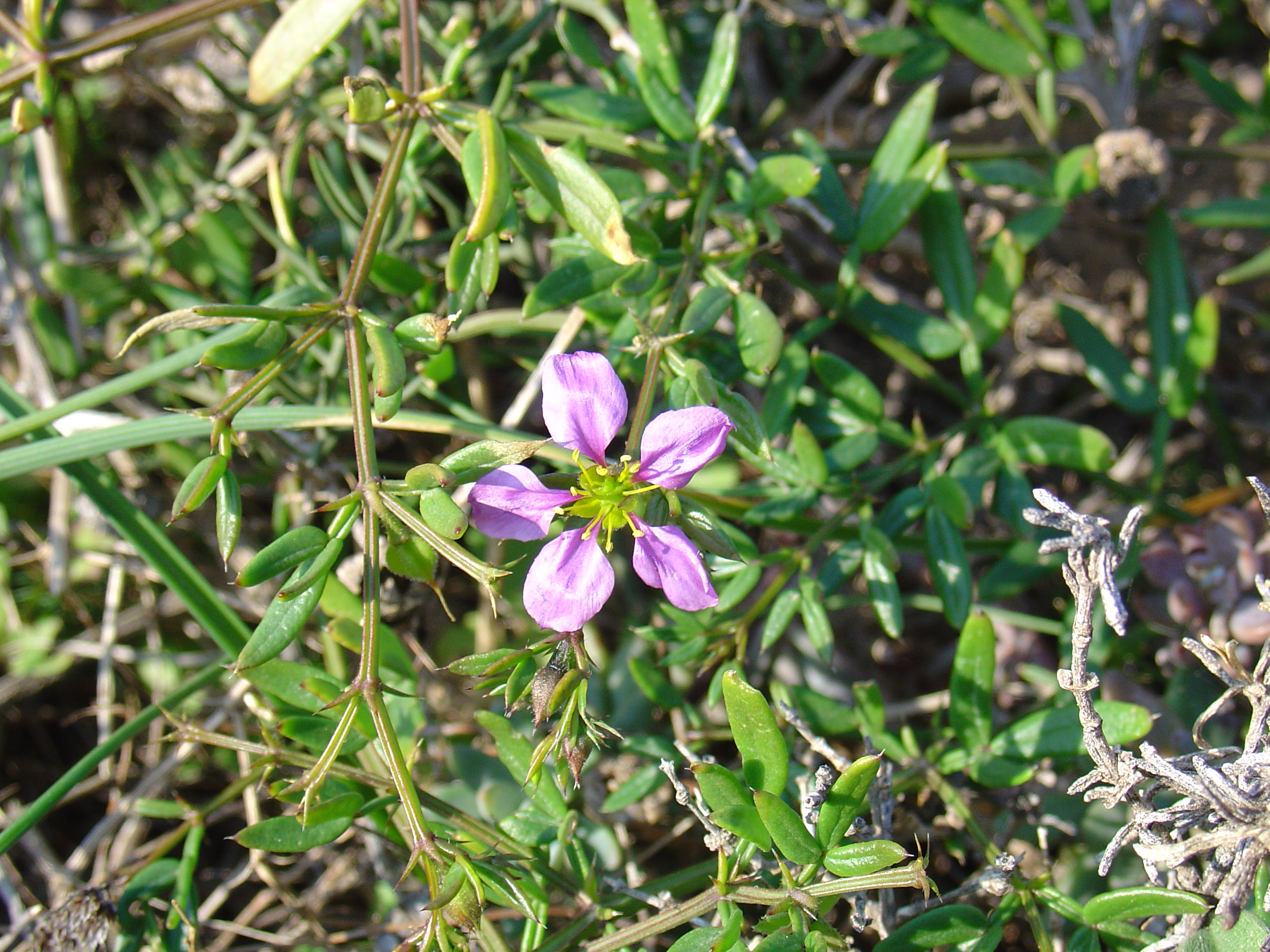
Fagonia cretica, syn. Zygophyllum creticum, Cartagena, Spain

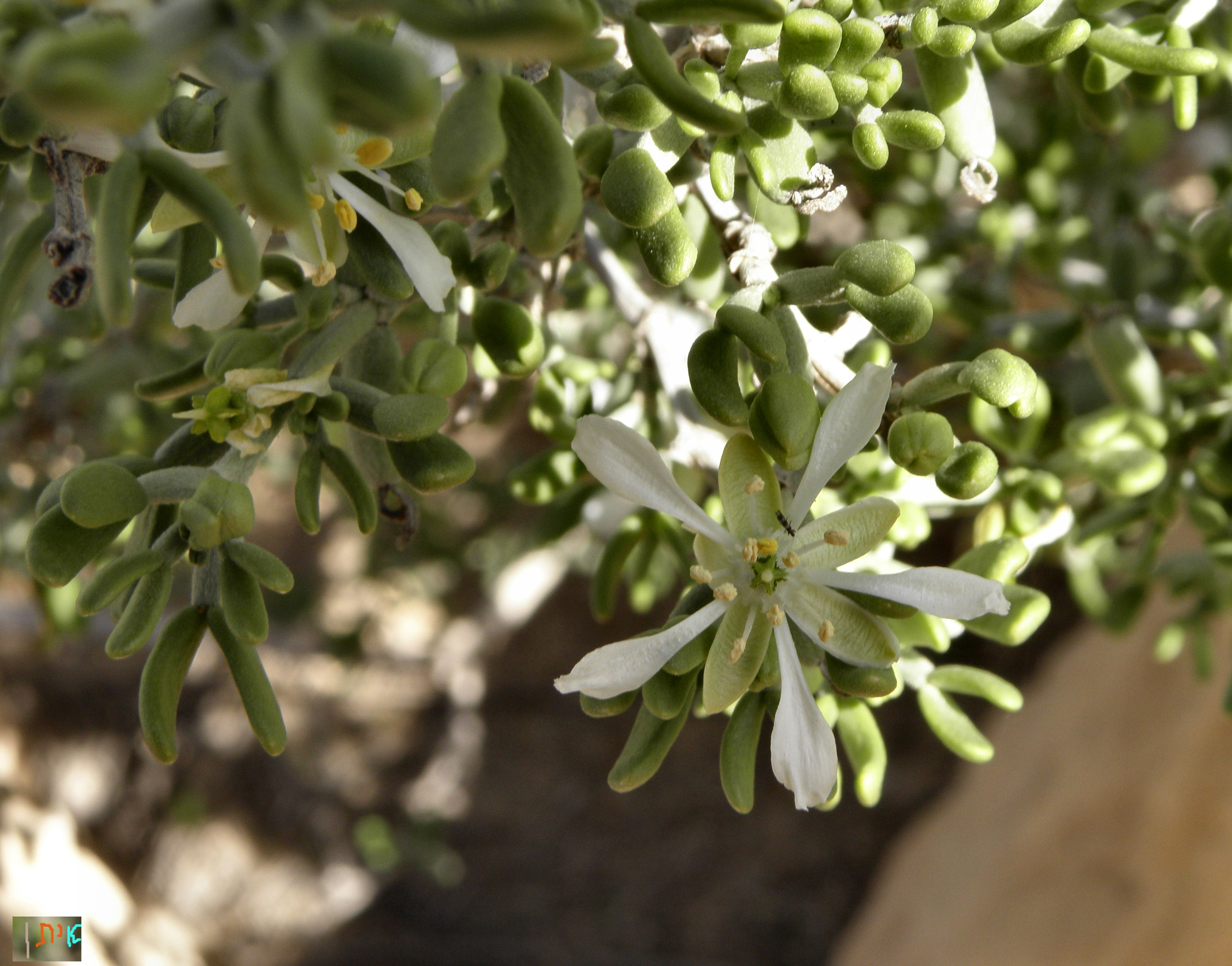
Zygophyllum dumosum, Negev Desert
