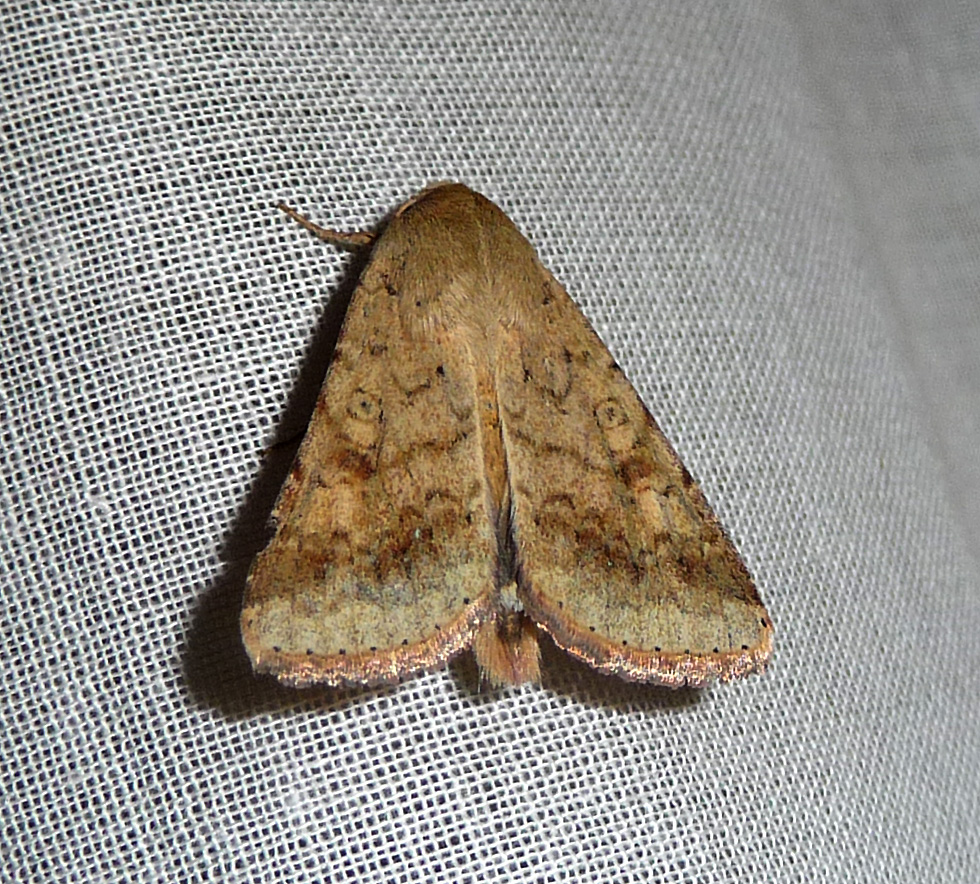

Scientific classification
- Domain: Eukaryota
- Kingdom: Animalia
- Phylum: Arthropoda
- Class: Insecta
- Order: Lepidoptera
- Superfamily: Noctuoidea
- Family: Noctuidae
- Genus: Heliothis
- Species: H. nubigera

Binomial name
- Heliothis nubigera Herrich-Schäffer, 1851

Synonyms
- Chloridea nubigera Rothschild, 1915

= Heliothis nubigera =

Species of moth

Heliothis nubigera, the eastern bordered straw, is a species of moth of the family Noctuidae. It is found in arid areas in the Palearctic realm.

== Technical description and variation ==
The wingspan is 35–40 mm. Forewing greyish ochreous; reniform stigma dark grey, attached to the grey costal median spot; orbicular annular with grey centre; outer line lunulate dentate, the teeth whitish, separated by a brown shade from the subterminal line; hindwing pearly white with broad blackish outer border, containing a double whitish blotch between veins 2 and 4; veins and cell spot dark; fringe white.

== Similar species ==
Heliothis peltigera shows a more prominent pattern and darker hind wings. The clear kidney blemishes are connected to the anterior margin.The cotton bollworm moth (Helicoverpa armigera) is lighter in colour and has a lower contrast.

== Biology ==
Adults are on wing year round and there are probably two generations.

Larva red-brown, dorsal line darker, subdorsal band alternately black and white; a diffused brown sublateral band. The larvae are polyphagous on various wild herbaceous plants. Recorded food plants include Zygophyllum, globe thistles (Echinops species), honeysuckle (Lonicera species), Mediterranean saltbush (Atriplex halimus), Retama raetam, Suaeda asphaltica and bushy bean-caper (Zygophyllum dumosum).

== Distribution ==
It is found in all the Levant countries.

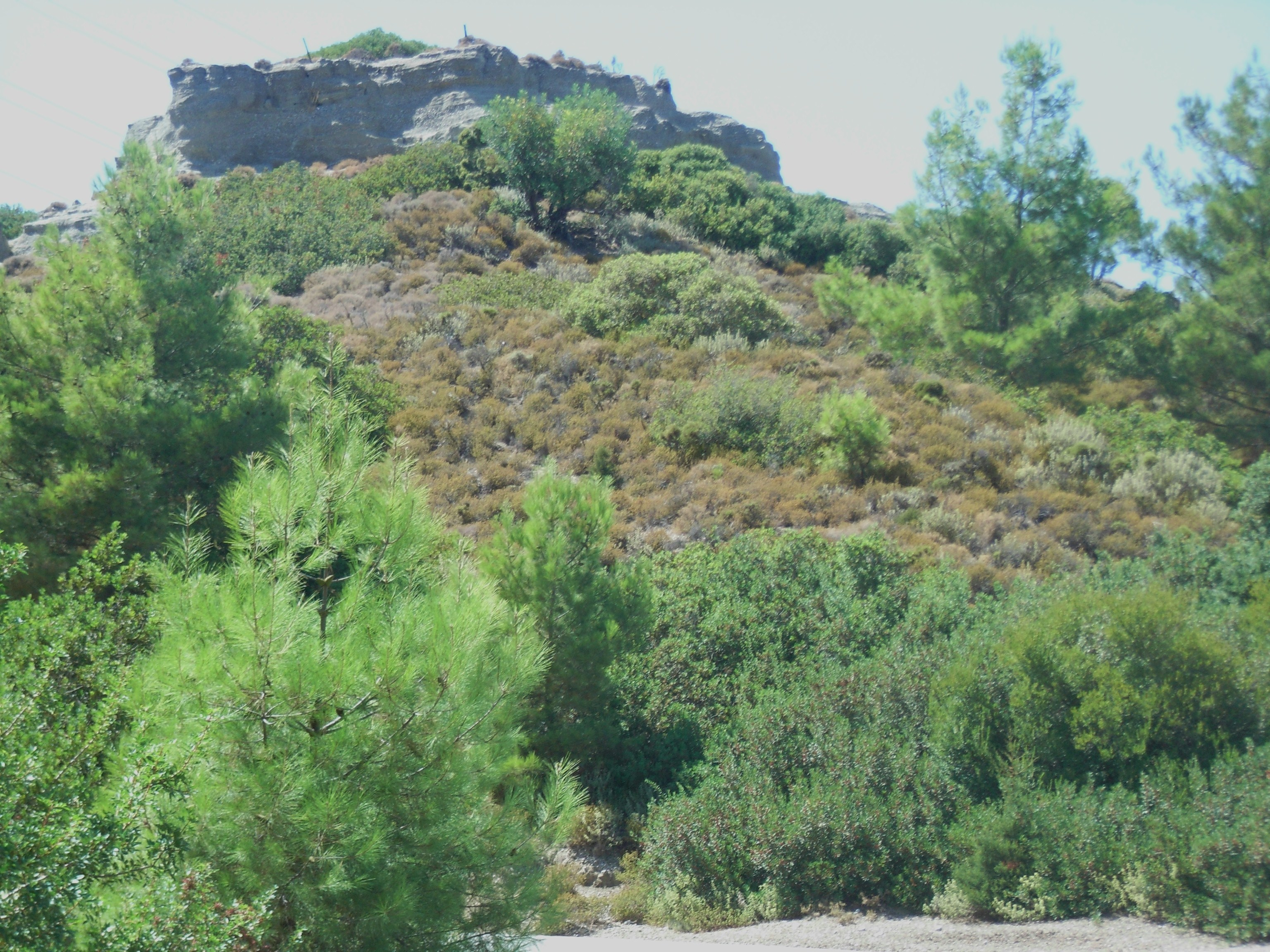
Garrigue (Phrygana) habitat, Rhodes
