= Miltianthus =

Scientific classification
- Kingdom: Plantae
- Clade: Tracheophytes
- Clade: Angiosperms
- Clade: Eudicots
- Clade: Rosids
- Order: Zygophyllales
- Family: Zygophyllaceae
- Subfamily: Zygophylloideae
- Genus: Miltianthus; Bunge (1847)
- Species: M. portulacoides

Binomial name
- Miltianthus portulacoides Bunge (1847)

Synonyms
- Zygophyllum macrophyllum Regel & Schmalh. (1882); Zygophyllum portulacoides Cham. (1830), nom. illeg.

Genus of flowering plants

Miltianthus portulacoides is species of flowering plant in the family Zygophyllaceae. It is the sole species in genus Miltianthus. It is native to Kyrgyzstan, Tajikistan, and Uzbekistan in central Asia.
