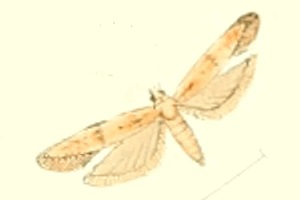

Scientific classification
- Domain: Eukaryota
- Kingdom: Animalia
- Phylum: Arthropoda
- Class: Insecta
- Order: Lepidoptera
- Family: Gelechiidae
- Genus: Vladimirea
- Species: V. glebicolorella

Binomial name
- Vladimirea glebicolorella (Erschoff, 1874)

Synonyms
- Bryotropha glebicolorella Erschoff, 1874; Vladimirea submaculata Povolný, 1967

= Vladimirea glebicolorella =

Species of moth

Vladimirea glebicolorella is a moth of the family Gelechiidae. It is found in Ukraine, Armenia, Uzbekistan, Turkmenistan, Iran and Afghanistan.

The wingspan is about 10 mm.

The larvae feed on Zygophyllum fabago. Young larvae mine the leaves of their host plant. Later, they live freely on the leaves or cause stem galls. Larvae can be found in June and July.
