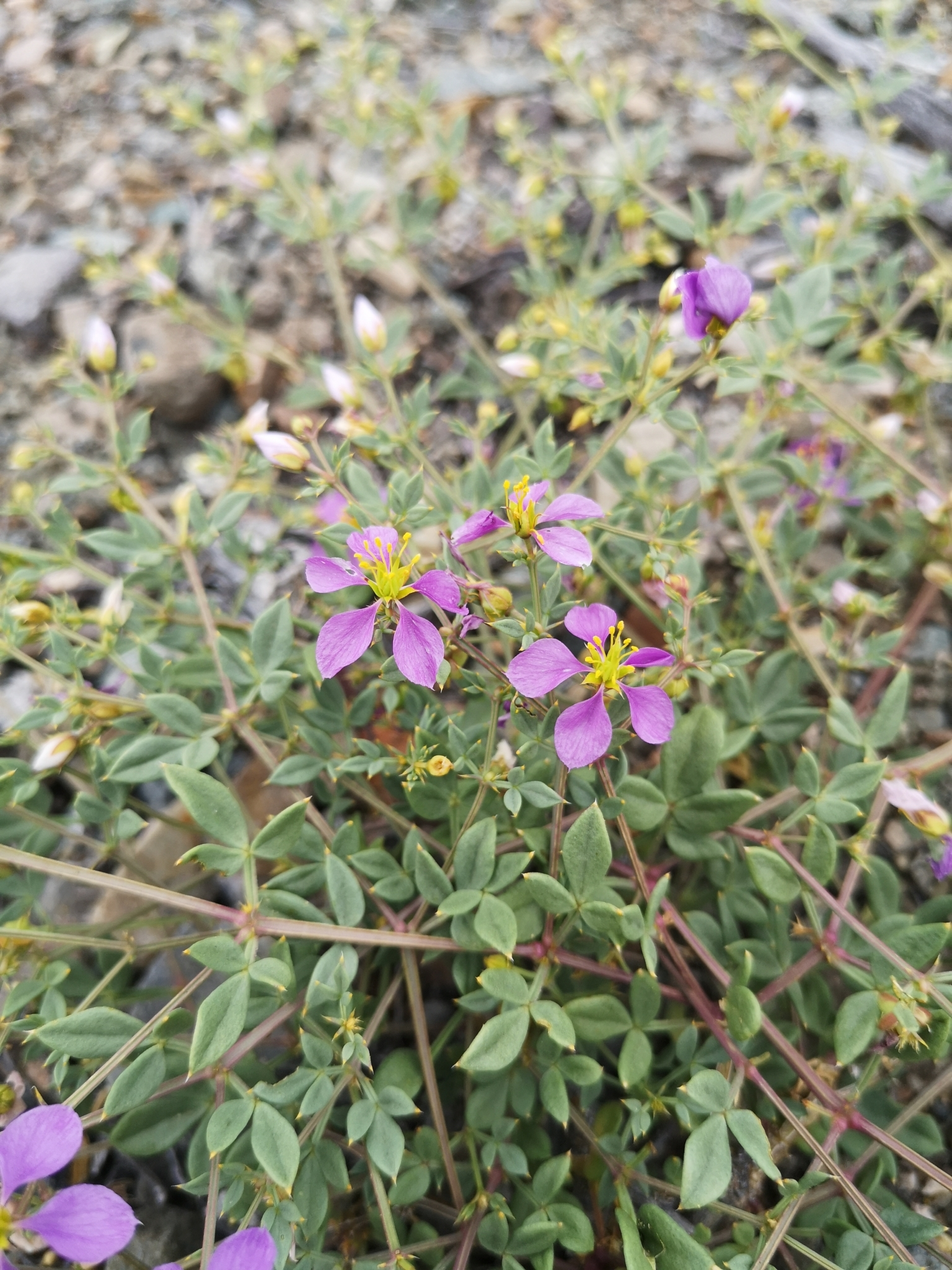
- In Antofagasta, Chile

Scientific classification
- Kingdom: Plantae
- Clade: Tracheophytes
- Clade: Angiosperms
- Clade: Eudicots
- Clade: Rosids
- Order: Zygophyllales
- Family: Zygophyllaceae
- Genus: Zygophyllum
- Species: Z. chilense

Binomial name
- Zygophyllum chilense (Hook. & Arn.) Christenh. & Byng

= Zygophyllum chilense =

Species of plant

Zygophyllum chilense is a species of flowering plant in the family Zygophyllaceae. It is a perennial herb native to northern Chile and Peru. It was formerly known as Fagonia chilensis but the genus Fagonia is now regarded as synonym to Zygophyllum.
