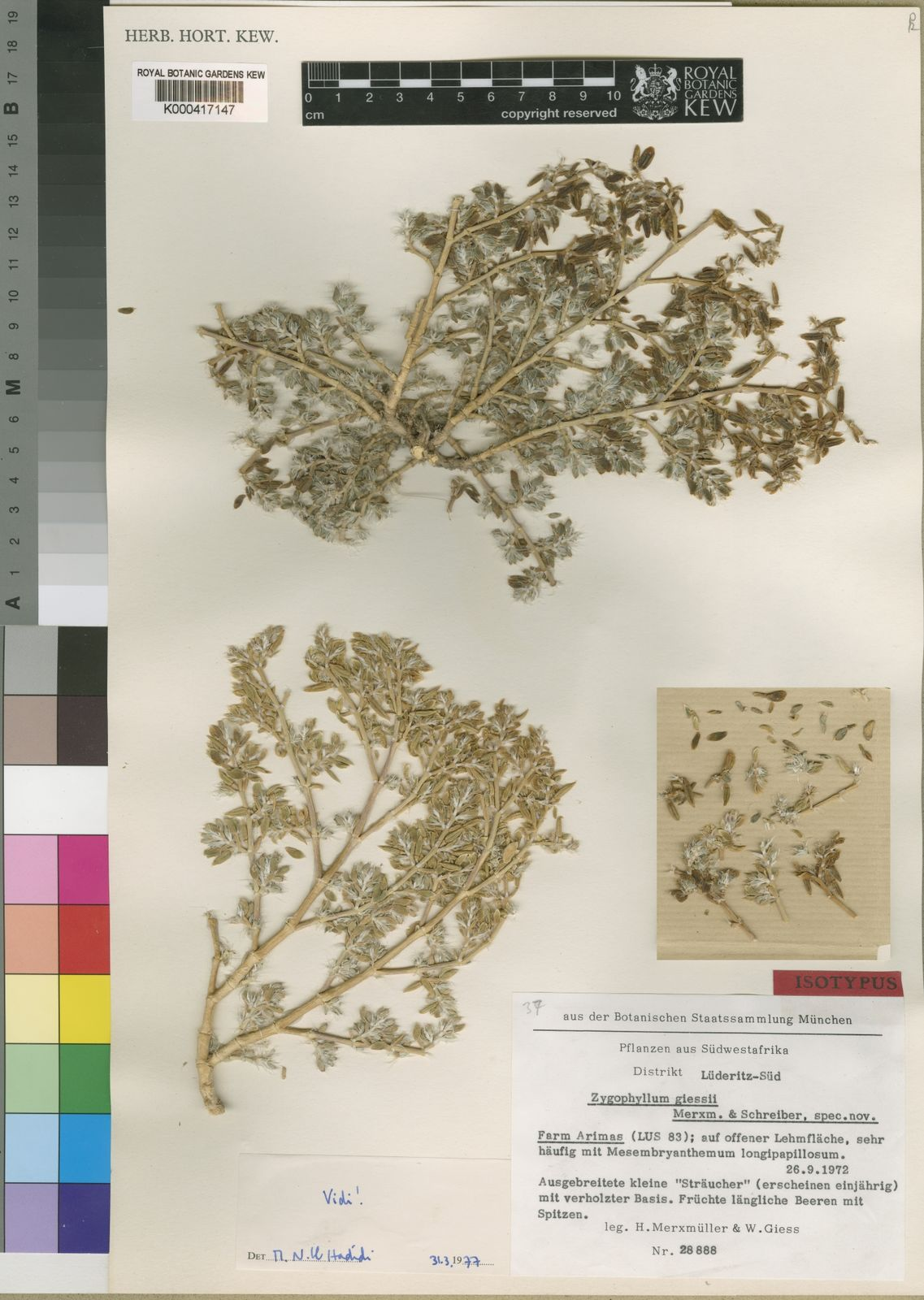

Conservation status
- Least Concern (IUCN 3.1)

Scientific classification
- Kingdom: Plantae
- Clade: Tracheophytes
- Clade: Angiosperms
- Clade: Eudicots
- Clade: Rosids
- Order: Zygophyllales
- Family: Zygophyllaceae
- Genus: Zygophyllum
- Species: Z. giessii

Binomial name
- Zygophyllum giessii Merxm. & A.Schreib.

Synonyms
- Tetraena giessii (Merxm. & A.Schreib.) Beier & Thulin

= Zygophyllum giessii =

Species of flowering plant

Zygophyllum giessii, synonym Tetraena giessii, is a species of plant in the family Zygophyllaceae. It is endemic to Namibia. Its natural habitats are rocky areas and cold desert. It is threatened by habitat loss.
