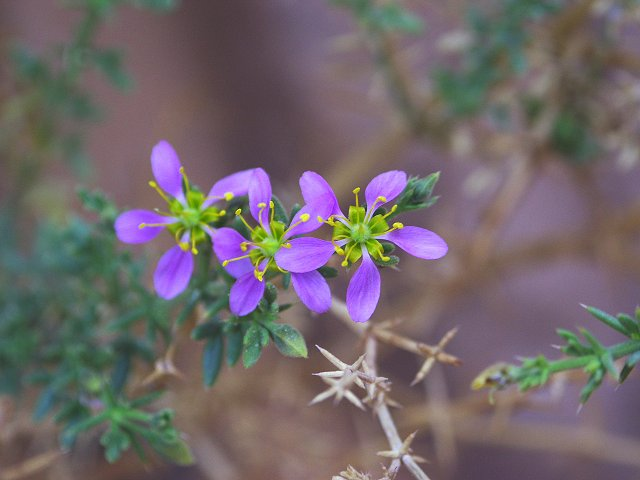
- Fagonia arabica

Scientific classification
- Kingdom: Plantae
- Clade: Embryophytes
- Clade: Tracheophytes
- Clade: Angiosperms
- Clade: Eudicots
- Clade: Rosids
- Order: Zygophyllales
- Family: Zygophyllaceae
- Subfamily: Zygophylloideae
- Genus: Fagonia; L.

Species
- See text

= Fagonia =

Genus of flowering plants

Fagonia is a genus of wild, flowering plants in the caltrop family, Zygophyllaceae, having about 34 species. The latest reorganization of the genus took place in 2018 when systematists Christenhusz & Byng, Royal Botanical Gardens, Kew (UK) included Fagonia spp.. along with several other Zygophyllum genera, into a new genus named "Zygophyllum L." Species occurring in the US are commonly referred to as fagonbushes. The distribution of the genus includes parts of Africa, the Mediterranean Basin, the Mid-East, India, and parts of North & South America. Fagonia species have been used ethnobotanically by traditional practitioners under Ayurvedic and other TM healing regimes for many maladies. Species occur in deserts, dry washes, ditches and on rocky outcrops, including at altitude.

Fagonia laevis is a perennial herb of the United States desert southwest. It has opposite leaves, trifoliate with spinescent stipules, a lavender corolla and smooth fruits. Under cultivation, F. indica has been found to have a long taproot and to its growth slowing where temperatures dipped below 65 F.

Commercial Fagonia products available on the web should be viewed with caution by reason of there being little to no authentication as to species contained therein, based on DNA analysis. It may be that all Fagonia species contain similar medicinal compounds but that has yet to be established as of 2015. Research carried out at Quaid-i-Azam U. in Pakistan found that three Pakistani Fagonia species, both the verified (per B.-A. Beier's 2005 reorganization of the genus) and unverified ones, were represented in commercial Fagonia (Dramas) products in the Islamabad marketplace. Plant systematists caution that species other than Fagonia, as well as other, unrelated material, can be present in commercial preparations.

Numerous scientific papers cite Fagonia cretica as the species studied. However, due to the re-ordering of Fagonia species by Beier in 2005, researchers have found that they have actually been studying another Fagonia species, instead, most commonly, Fagonia indica.

In 2022, researchers at the Linus Pauling Institute, Oregon State U., determined that an acid-hydrolyzed extract of F. indica was much more effective than an aqueous extract at causing MCF-7 breast cancer cell death and inhibiting further cell multiplication.

== Species ==
As of February 2025, Plants of the World Online considered Fagonia to be a synonym of Zygophyllum. Species formerly placed in Fagonia include:

- Fagonia acerosa Boiss. = Zygophyllum acerosum
- Fagonia arabica L. = Zygophyllum arabicum
- Fagonia bruguieri DC. = Zygophyllum bruguieri
- Fagonia californica Benth. = Zygophyllum californicum
- Fagonia charoides Chiov. = Zygophyllum charoides
- Fagonia chilensis Hook. & Arn. = Zygophyllum chilense
- Fagonia cretica L. = Zygophyllum creticum
- Fagonia densispina Beier & Thulin = Zygophyllum densispinum
- Fagonia densa I.M.Johnst. = Zygophyllum densum
- Fagonia glutinosa Delile = Zygophyllum glutinosum
- Fagonia gypsophila Beier & Thulin = Zygophyllum gypsophilum
- Fagonia hadramautica Beier & Thulin = Zygophyllum hadramauticum
- Fagonia harpago Emb. & Maire = Zygophyllum harpago
- Fagonia indica Burm.f. = Zygophyllum indicum
- Fagonia laevis Standl. = Zygophyllum laeve
- Fagonia lahovarii Volkens & Schweinf. = Zygophyllum lahovarii
- Fagonia latistipulata Beier & Thulin = Zygophyllum latistipulatum
- Fagonia luntii Baker = Zygophyllum luntii
- Fagonia mahrana Beier = Zygophyllum mahranum
- Fagonia latifolia Delile = Zygophyllum mayanum
- Fagonia minutistipula Engl. = Zygophyllum minutistipulum
- Fagonia mollis Delile = Zygophyllum molle
- Fagonia olivieri DC. = Zygophyllum olivieri
- Fagonia orientalis C.Presl = Zygophyllum orientale
- Fagonia pachyacantha Rydb. = Zygophyllum pachyacanthum
- Fagonia palmeri Vasey & Rose = Zygophyllum palmeri
- Fagonia paulayana J.Wagner & Vierh. = Zygophyllum paulayanum
- Fagonia scabra Forssk. = Zygophyllum scabrum
- Fagonia scoparia Brandegee = Zygophyllum scoparium
- Fagonia spinosissima Blatt. & Hallb. = Zygophyllum spinosissimum
- Fagonia subinermis Boiss. = Zygophyllum subinerme
- Tetraena tenuis (R.Glover) Beier & Thulin = Zygophyllum tenue
- Fagonia villosa D.M.Porter = Zygophyllum villosum
- Fagonia zilloides Humbert = Zygophyllum zilloides
