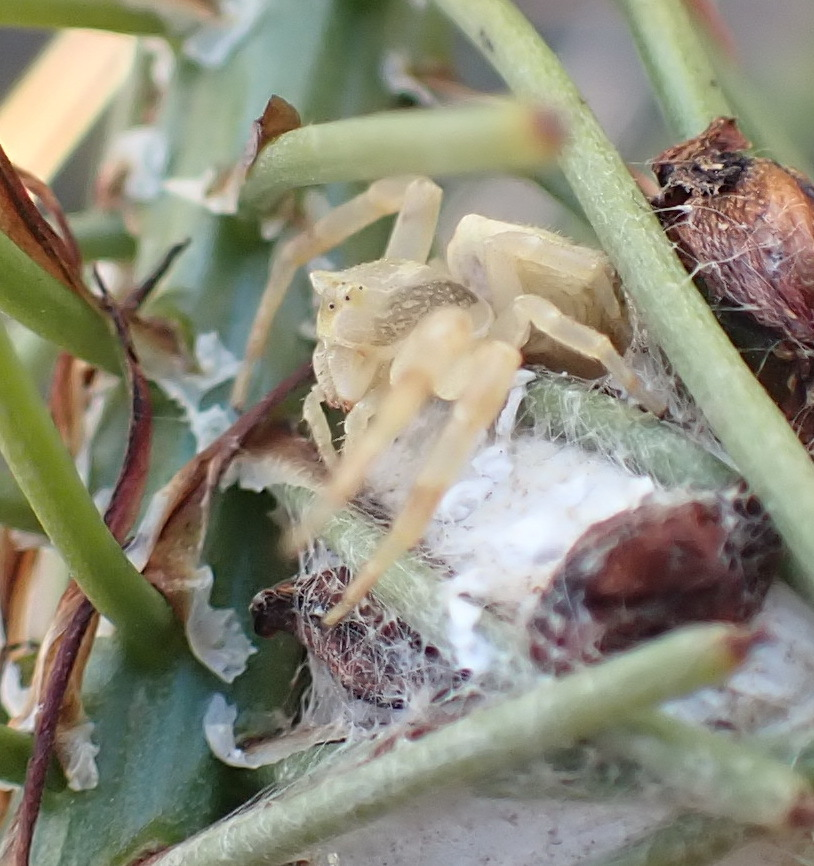
- female from South Africa

Scientific classification
- Kingdom: Animalia
- Phylum: Arthropoda
- Subphylum: Chelicerata
- Class: Arachnida
- Order: Araneae
- Infraorder: Araneomorphae
- Family: Thomisidae
- Genus: Thomisus
- Species: T. schultzei

Binomial name
- Thomisus schultzei Simon, 1910

= Thomisus schultzei =

Schultz's Thomisus crab spider

Species of spider

Thomisus schultzei is a species of crab spider in the family Thomisidae. It is endemic to southern Africa, where it occurs in Namibia, Botswana, and South Africa. The species is commonly known as Schultz's Thomisus crab spider.

== Etymology ==
The species is named after Leonhard Schultze, a German zoologist and explorer who led the expedition during which the type specimen was collected.

== Distribution ==
Thomisus schultzei is known from three southern African countries: Namibia, Botswana, and South Africa. In South Africa, the species has been recorded from four provinces: the Free State, Gauteng, Northern Cape, and North West.

The species has been found at elevations ranging from 988 to 1,541 metres above sea level.

== Habitat ==
Thomisus schultzei is known only from the warm and dry regions of southern Africa. The species has been sampled from the Grassland, Nama and Succulent Karoo biomes. In the central Namib Desert, the species was observed living on Zygophyllum simplex plants almost throughout the year.

== Description ==
Currently, only females of Thomisus schultzei are known; males and juveniles remain undescribed.

The female has a total length of 7.8 mm (ranging from 4.9-9.8 mm) and a cephalothorax length of 3.1 mm (2.2-3.6 mm). The cephalothorax width is 3.2 mm (2.3-3.6 mm). The carapace and legs are fawn-coloured, while the cephalic area shows white suffusion with white angles between the anterior eyes, which appear brownish. The opisthosoma is white.

The area containing the eyes is slightly elevated, with blunt eye tubercles that are not very prominent. The anterior eye row is recurved while the posterior row is straight. The anterior eyes are equal in size, with the anterior median eyes closer to each other than to the anterior lateral eyes. The posterior eyes are equal in size, with the posterior median eyes closer to the posterior lateral eyes than to each other. The posterior eyes are smaller than the anterior eyes.

The opisthosoma is bell-shaped. The front parts of the legs are strong, with tibiae I and II bearing 3-4 pairs of macro-setae and metatarsi I and II having 6 pairs. The integument is covered with numerous small tubercles, each bearing a short club-shaped seta. The opisthosoma also has spiniform setae.

The epigyne is elevated with two semi-circular pits divided anteriorly by a median septum.

== Behaviour ==
Females have been collected between November and June. The species has been observed feeding on Halictid (sweat bees) and Tinaegeriid (concealer moths) adults.

== Conservation status ==
Thomisus schultzei is classified as Least Concern due to its wide geographical range across southern Africa. The species is recorded in several protected areas including Tussen die Riviere Nature Reserve, Erfenis Dam Nature Reserve, and Kgalagadi Transfrontier Park. No significant threats have been identified and no specific conservation actions are recommended.
