= Vladimirea zygophylli =

Scientific classification
- Domain: Eukaryota
- Kingdom: Animalia
- Phylum: Arthropoda
- Class: Insecta
- Order: Lepidoptera
- Family: Gelechiidae
- Genus: Vladimirea
- Species: V. zygophylli

Binomial name
- Vladimirea zygophylli (Kuznetsov, 1960)

Synonyms
- Aristotelia zygophylli Kuznetsov, 1960

Species of moth

Vladimirea zygophylli is a moth in the family Gelechiidae. It was described by Vladimir Ivanovitsch Kuznetsov in 1960. It is found in Saudi Arabia, Iran and Turkmenistan.

The larvae feed on Zygophyllum species.
