= Zygophyllum mongolicum =

Scientific classification
- Kingdom: Plantae
- Clade: Tracheophytes
- Clade: Angiosperms
- Clade: Eudicots
- Clade: Rosids
- Order: Zygophyllales
- Family: Zygophyllaceae
- Genus: Zygophyllum
- Species: Z. mongolicum

Binomial name
- Zygophyllum mongolicum (Maxim.) Christenh. & Byng

Synonyms
- Tetraena mongolica Maxim.

Species of plant

Zygophyllum mongolicum is a species of flowering plant in the family Zygophyllaceae. It is endemic to the Inner Mongolia region in China. It was formerly known as Tetraena mongolica but the genus Tetraena is now regarded as synonym to Zygophyllum. The endangered status of this species and its xerophytic lifestyle adapted to withstand harsh environments prompted researchers to sequence its genome, the first of a member of the order Zygophyllales.
