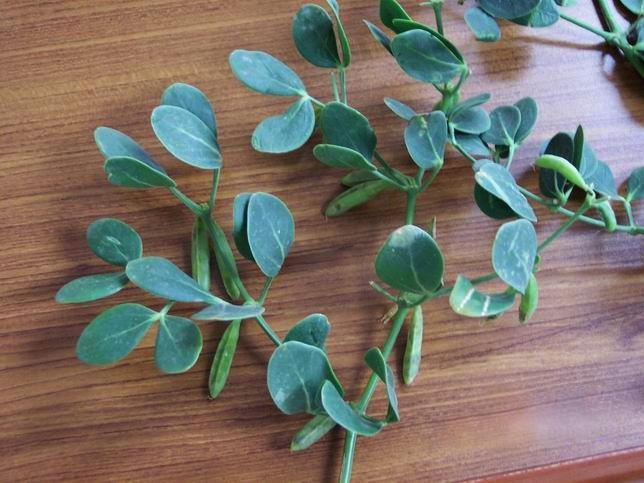

Scientific classification
- Kingdom: Plantae
- Clade: Tracheophytes
- Clade: Angiosperms
- Clade: Eudicots
- Clade: Rosids
- Order: Zygophyllales
- Family: Zygophyllaceae
- Genus: Zygophyllum
- Species: Z. fabago

Binomial name
- Zygophyllum fabago L.

= Zygophyllum fabago =

Species of flowering plant

Zygophyllum fabago is a species of plant known by the common name Syrian bean-caper. It is considered a noxious weed of economic importance in much of the western United States. It is native to Asia, East Europe (Russia and Ukraine), and Southeast Europe (Romania).

== Growth ==
The Syrian bean-caper grows long, thin stems with few oval-shaped, fleshy, waxy green leaflets each 2 to 3 centimeters in length. The flowers are small, compact bunches of five petals each with prominent stamens. The flowers have a taste and scent similar to caper. It grows in masses of individual plants, forming colonies, especially in dry, gravelly, saline, or disturbed areas where other plant life is rare.

== Characteristics ==
The plant has invasive potential due to its long taproot which, even if fragmented, can produce a new plant, as well as the hardy wax coating on its leaves that tends to protect it from herbicides.

== Chemical constituents ==
It contains about 0.002% harmine (entire plant).
