= Zygophyllum zilloides =

Scientific classification
- Kingdom: Plantae
- Clade: Tracheophytes
- Clade: Angiosperms
- Clade: Eudicots
- Clade: Rosids
- Order: Zygophyllales
- Family: Zygophyllaceae
- Genus: Zygophyllum
- Species: Z. zilloides

Binomial name
- Zygophyllum zilloides (Humbert) Christenh. & Byng

Synonyms
- Fagonia malvana Maire & Weiller; Fagonia zilloides Humbert

Species of plant

Zygophyllum zilloides (syn. Fagonia zilloides) is a species of flowering plant in the torchwood family Zygophyllaceae, native to the western Sahara desert. A subshrub, its fruits are loculicidal capsules.
