= Vladimirea subtilis =

Scientific classification
- Kingdom: Animalia
- Phylum: Arthropoda
- Clade: Pancrustacea
- Class: Insecta
- Order: Lepidoptera
- Family: Gelechiidae
- Genus: Vladimirea
- Species: V. subtilis

Binomial name
- Vladimirea subtilis Povolný, 1969

Species of moth

Vladimirea subtilis is a moth in the family Gelechiidae. It was described by Dalibor Povolný in 1969. It is found in Mongolia.
