= Vladimirea ivinskisi =

Scientific classification
- Kingdom: Animalia
- Phylum: Arthropoda
- Clade: Pancrustacea
- Class: Insecta
- Order: Lepidoptera
- Family: Gelechiidae
- Genus: Vladimirea
- Species: V. ivinskisi

Binomial name
- Vladimirea ivinskisi Piskunov, 1980

Species of moth

Vladimirea ivinskisi is a moth in the family Gelechiidae. It was described by Piskunov in 1980. It is found in Mongolia.
