= Vladimirea wiltshirei =

Scientific classification
- Kingdom: Animalia
- Phylum: Arthropoda
- Clade: Pancrustacea
- Class: Insecta
- Order: Lepidoptera
- Family: Gelechiidae
- Genus: Vladimirea
- Species: V. wiltshirei

Binomial name
- Vladimirea wiltshirei Povolný, 1967

Species of moth

Vladimirea wiltshirei is a moth in the family Gelechiidae. It was described by Povolný in 1967. It is found in Bahrain.
