= Vladimirea kizilkumica =

Scientific classification
- Kingdom: Animalia
- Phylum: Arthropoda
- Clade: Pancrustacea
- Class: Insecta
- Order: Lepidoptera
- Family: Gelechiidae
- Genus: Vladimirea
- Species: V. kizilkumica

Binomial name
- Vladimirea kizilkumica Piskunov, 1990

Species of moth

Vladimirea kizilkumica is a moth in the family Gelechiidae. It was described by Piskunov in 1990. It is found in Uzbekistan, where it was described from the Kyzylkum Desert in the Burkhara District.
