= Augea (plant) =

Augea is a possible monotypic genus of flowering plants in the family Zygophyllaceae. Its only species is Augea capensis, native to Namibia and the western Cape Province of South Africa. The genus and species were first described by Carl Peter Thunberg in 1794.

The genus is placed in the subfamily Zygophylloideae. As of February 2025, the subfamily's division into genera remains disputed. Augea is accepted by some sources, but regarded as a synonym of Zygophyllum by others, including Plants of the World Online, which treats Augea capensis as Zygophyllum augea.
