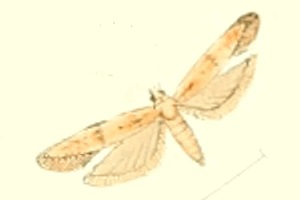
- Vladimirea glebicolorella

Scientific classification
- Kingdom: Animalia
- Phylum: Arthropoda
- Clade: Pancrustacea
- Class: Insecta
- Order: Lepidoptera
- Family: Gelechiidae
- Tribe: Gnorimoschemini
- Genus: Vladimirea; Povolný, 1967

Synonyms
- Distinxia Povolný, 1967

= Vladimirea =

Genus of moths

Vladimirea is a genus of moths in the family Gelechiidae.

== Species ==
- Vladimirea amseli Povolný, 1967
- Vladimirea brunnealis Povolný, 1969
- Vladimirea glebicolorella (Erschoff, 1874)
- Vladimirea ivinskisi Piskunov, 1980
- Vladimirea kahirica Povolný, 1967
- Vladimirea kizilkumica Piskunov, 1990
- Vladimirea krasilnikovae Lvovsky & Piskunov, 1989
- Vladimirea magna Povolný, 1969
- Vladimirea maxima Povolný, 1969
- Vladimirea stepicola Povolný, 1976
- Vladimirea subtilis Povolný, 1969
- Vladimirea wiltshirei Povolný, 1967
- Vladimirea zygophylli (Kuznetsov, 1960)
- Vladimirea zygophyllivorella (Kuznetsov, 1960)
