= Vladimirea krasilnikovae =

Scientific classification
- Kingdom: Animalia
- Phylum: Arthropoda
- Clade: Pancrustacea
- Class: Insecta
- Order: Lepidoptera
- Family: Gelechiidae
- Genus: Vladimirea
- Species: V. krasilnikovae

Binomial name
- Vladimirea krasilnikovae Lvovsky & Piskunov, 1989

Species of moth

Vladimirea krasilnikovae is a moth in the family Gelechiidae. It was described by Alexandr L. Lvovsky and Vladimir I. Piskunov in 1989. It is found in Gobi Desert.
