= Vladimirea zygophyllivorella =

Scientific classification
- Domain: Eukaryota
- Kingdom: Animalia
- Phylum: Arthropoda
- Class: Insecta
- Order: Lepidoptera
- Family: Gelechiidae
- Genus: Vladimirea
- Species: V. zygophyllivorella

Binomial name
- Vladimirea zygophyllivorella (Kuznetsov, 1960)

Synonyms
- Aristotelia zygophyllivorella Kuznetsov, 1960

Species of moth

Vladimirea zygophyllivorella is a moth in the family Gelechiidae. It was described by Vladimir Ivanovitsch Kuznetsov in 1960. It is found in Turkmenistan.
