= Vladimirea brunnealis =

Scientific classification
- Kingdom: Animalia
- Phylum: Arthropoda
- Clade: Pancrustacea
- Class: Insecta
- Order: Lepidoptera
- Family: Gelechiidae
- Genus: Vladimirea
- Species: V. brunnealis

Binomial name
- Vladimirea brunnealis Povolný, 1969

Species of moth

Vladimirea brunnealis is a moth in the family Gelechiidae. It was described by Dalibor Povolný in 1969. It is found in Mongolia.
