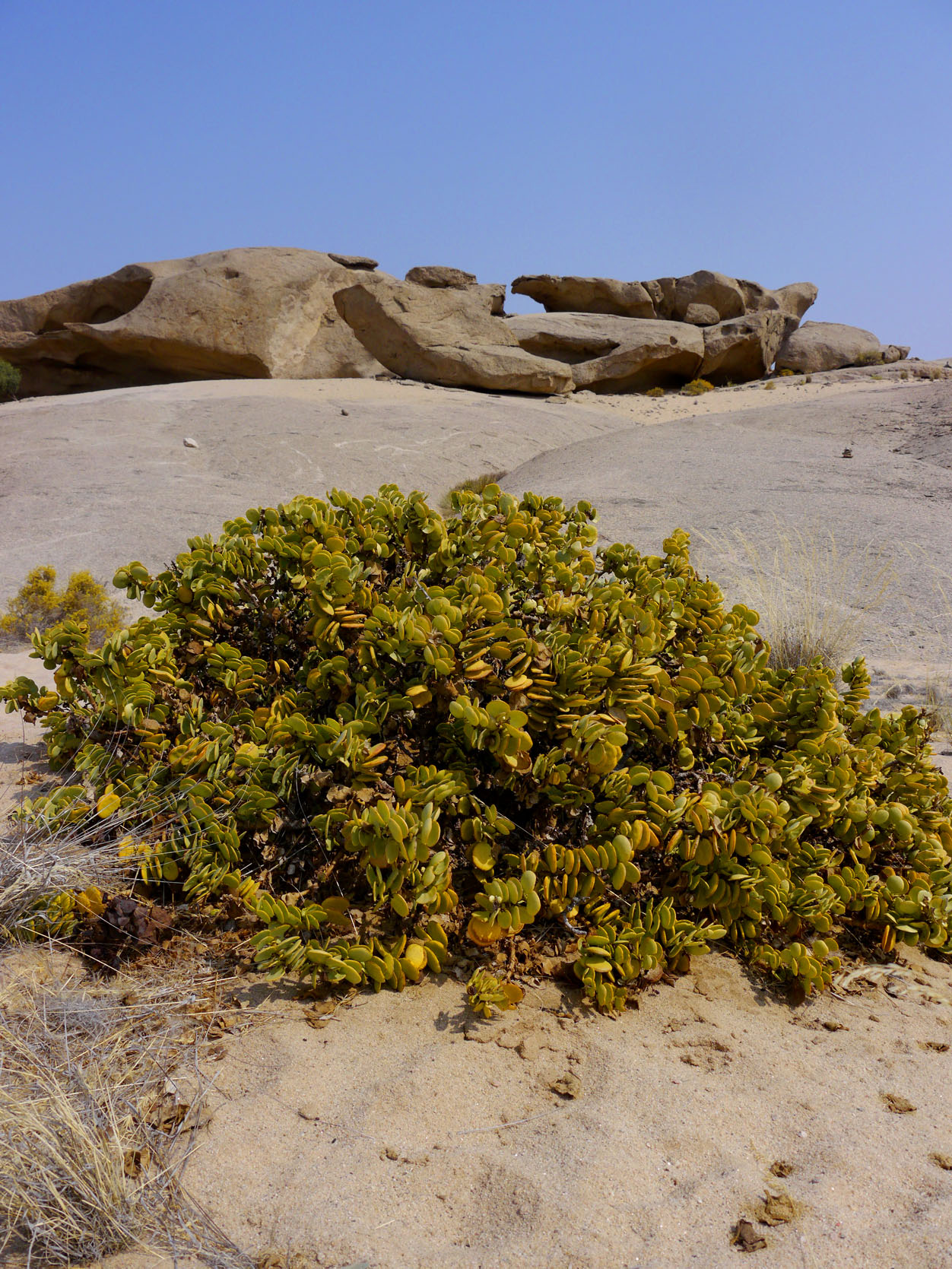

Scientific classification
- Kingdom: Plantae
- Clade: Tracheophytes
- Clade: Angiosperms
- Clade: Eudicots
- Clade: Rosids
- Order: Zygophyllales
- Family: Zygophyllaceae
- Genus: Zygophyllum
- Species: Z. stapffii

Binomial name
- Zygophyllum stapffii Schinz

Synonyms
- Tetraena stapffii (Schinz) Beier & Thulin; Zygophyllum marlothii Engl.

= Zygophyllum stapffii =

Species of plant

Zygophyllum stapffii, synonym Tetraena stapffii, (Afrikaans: daalderplant, English: dollar bush) is a species of flowering bush endemic to Namibia. As of January 2025, the specific epithet was sometimes spelt with a single f, i.e. stapfii, but the International Plant Names Index spells it with double f.

It grows in the Namib ecoregion along the Atlantic Ocean coast. Most of this plant's moisture comes from the morning mist. The shrub's round, coin-like leaves lend it its colloquial name: daalder is an old Dutch coin worth one and a half guilders.

== Image gallery ==
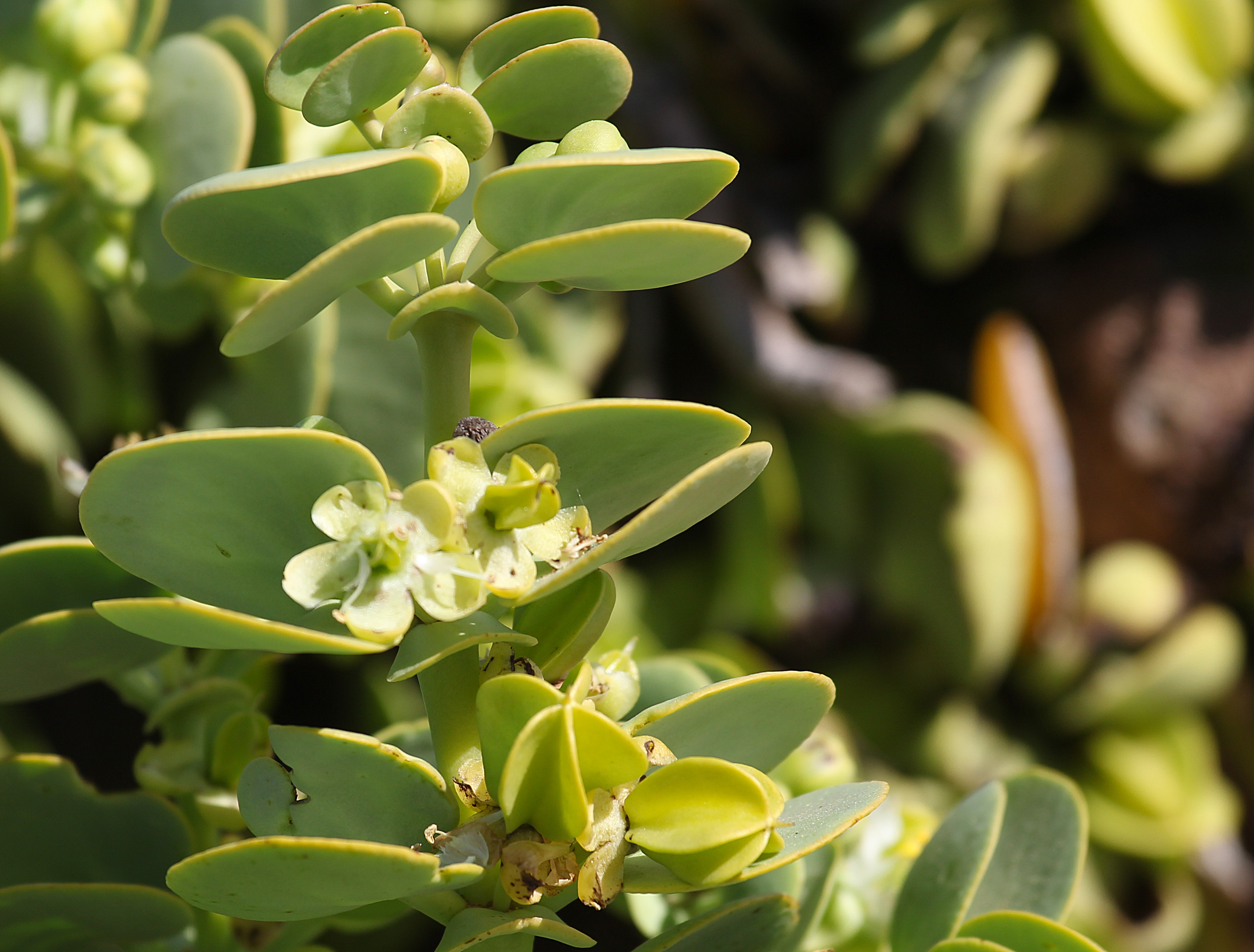
Flowers up close

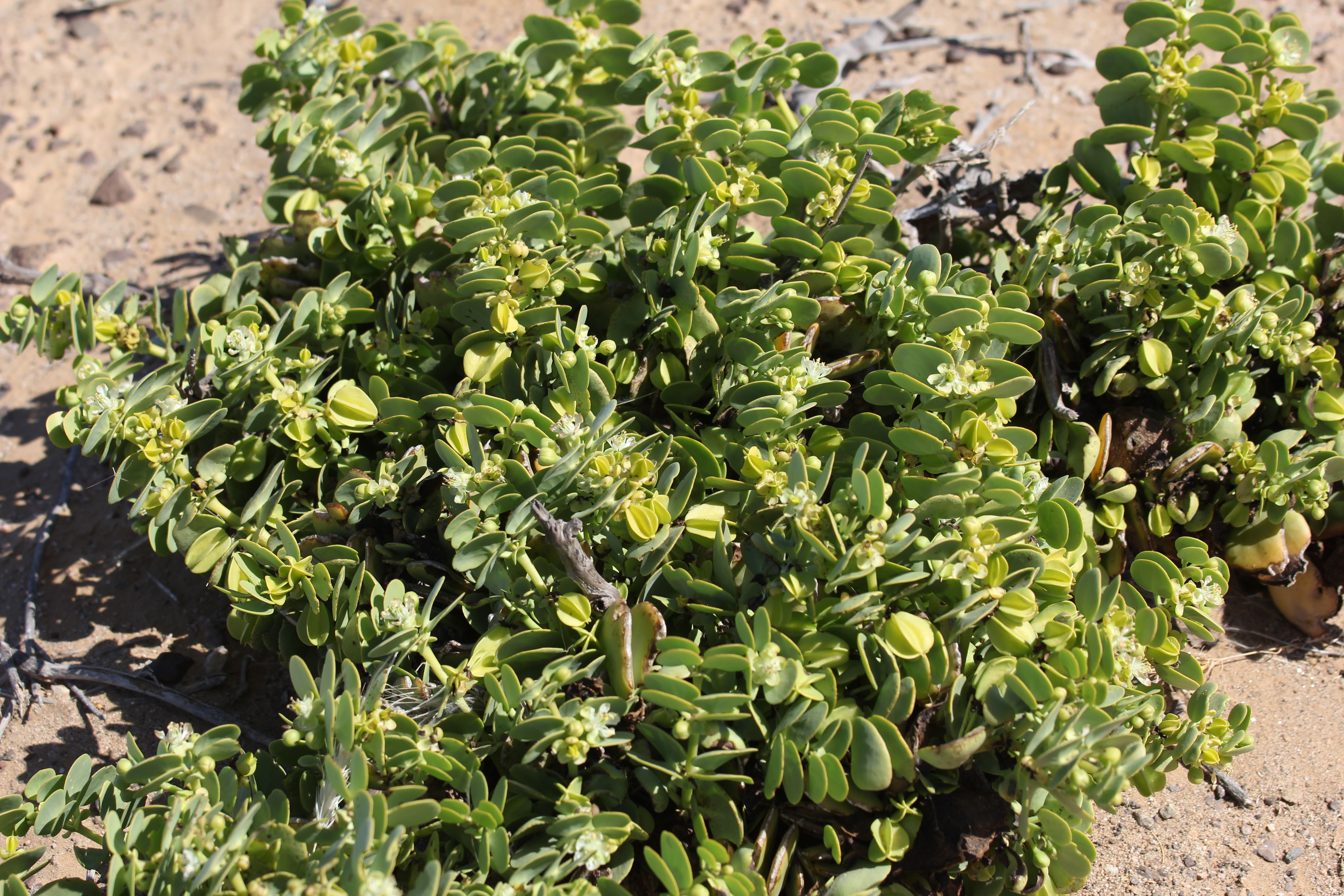
Full bush
