= Vladimirea magna =

Scientific classification
- Kingdom: Animalia
- Phylum: Arthropoda
- Clade: Pancrustacea
- Class: Insecta
- Order: Lepidoptera
- Family: Gelechiidae
- Genus: Vladimirea
- Species: V. magna

Binomial name
- Vladimirea magna Povolný, 1969

Species of moth

Vladimirea magna is a moth in the family Gelechiidae. It was described by Dalibor Povolný in 1969. It is found in Iran, Armenia, and Turkmenistan.
