= Vladimirea stepicola =

Scientific classification
- Kingdom: Animalia
- Phylum: Arthropoda
- Clade: Pancrustacea
- Class: Insecta
- Order: Lepidoptera
- Family: Gelechiidae
- Genus: Vladimirea
- Species: V. stepicola

Binomial name
- Vladimirea stepicola Povolný, 1976

Species of moth

Vladimirea stepicola is a moth in the family Gelechiidae. It was described by Povolný in 1976. It is found in southern Iran.

The length of the forewings is 2.8–3.4 mm.
