= Vladimirea kahirica =

Scientific classification
- Kingdom: Animalia
- Phylum: Arthropoda
- Clade: Pancrustacea
- Class: Insecta
- Order: Lepidoptera
- Family: Gelechiidae
- Genus: Vladimirea
- Species: V. kahirica

Binomial name
- Vladimirea kahirica Povolný, 1967

Species of moth

Vladimirea kahirica is a moth in the family Gelechiidae. It was described by Dalibor Povolný in 1967. It is found in Algeria.
