= Zygophyllum pterocaule =

Scientific classification
- Kingdom: Plantae
- Clade: Tracheophytes
- Clade: Angiosperms
- Clade: Eudicots
- Clade: Rosids
- Order: Zygophyllales
- Family: Zygophyllaceae
- Genus: Zygophyllum
- Species: Z. pterocaule

Binomial name
- Zygophyllum pterocaule Van Zyl

Synonyms
- Tetraena pterocaulis (Van Zyl) Beier & Thulin

Species of plant

Zygophyllum pterocaule is a species of flowering plant in the family Zygophyllaceae, native to Namibia, and the northern Cape Provinces of South Africa. A succulent, decumbent shrub, it only reaches 15 cm (6 in) high, but spreads to 80 cm (30 in).
