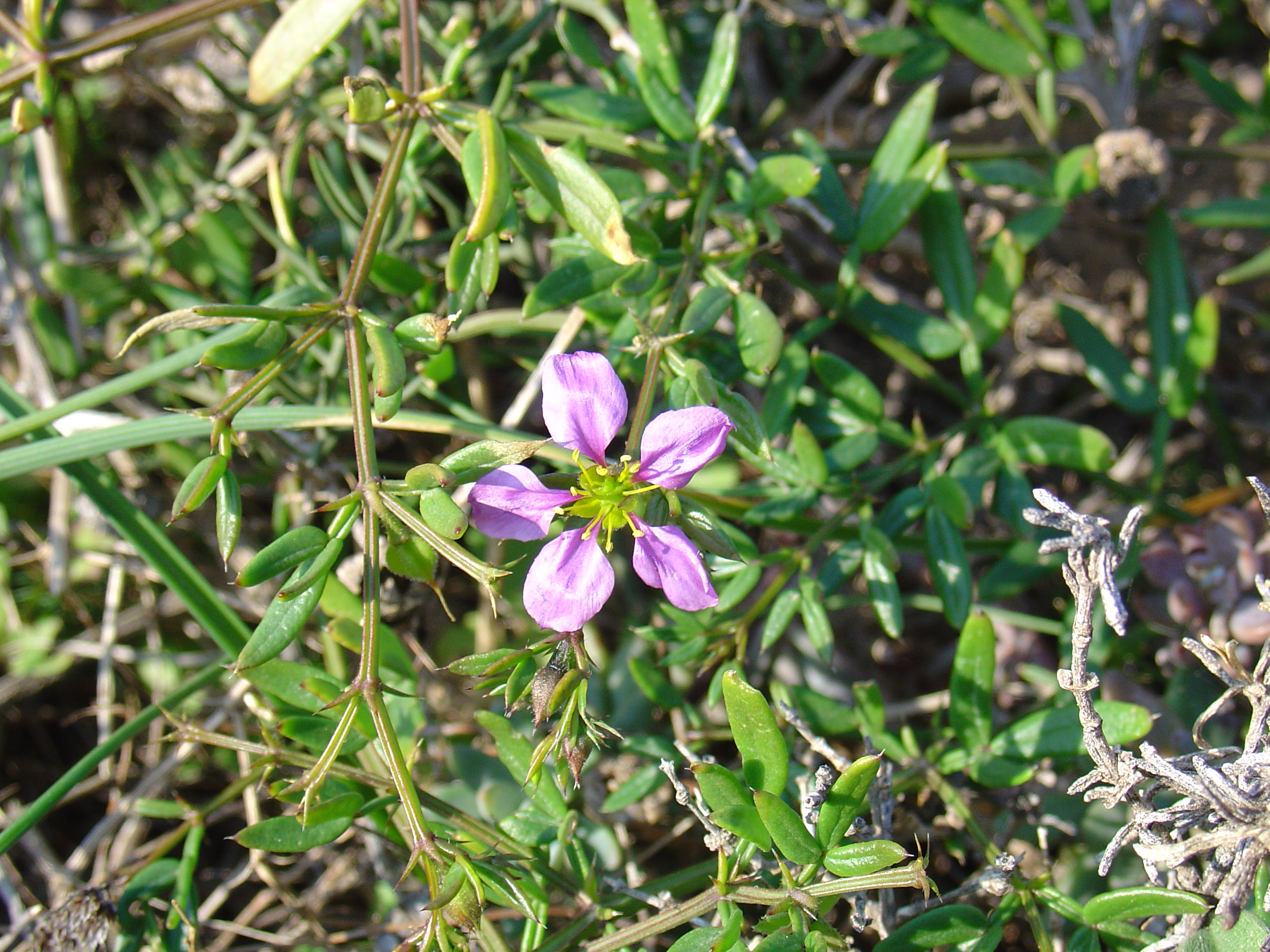
- Bright sunlight: Flower, stems, and leaves

Scientific classification
- Kingdom: Plantae
- Clade: Tracheophytes
- Clade: Angiosperms
- Clade: Eudicots
- Clade: Rosids
- Order: Zygophyllales
- Family: Zygophyllaceae
- Genus: Fagonia
- Species: F. cretica

Binomial name
- Fagonia cretica L.

= Fagonia cretica =

Species of flowering plant

Zygophyllum creticum formerly known as Fagonia cretica is a species of plant in the caltrop family (Zygophyllaceae). It is native to dry regions of the Mediterranean Basin in North Africa (in Cape Verde, Canary Islands, Morocco, Algeria, Tunisia, Libya and Egypt), Southern Europe (in the Balearic Islands, Portugal, Southeast Spain, Sicily, and Greece) and West Asia (in Saudi Arabia and the Sinai peninsula).

Zygophyllum creticum is a plant of rocky coastlines. It is a creeping plant with fleshy leaves and star-shaped flowers with 5-narrow, purple or violet to light violet petals.

== Properties ==
The plant has a sweet, bitter, sharp and sour taste according to different stages of growth and parts. The plant has a large number of small fruits near the thorns.
