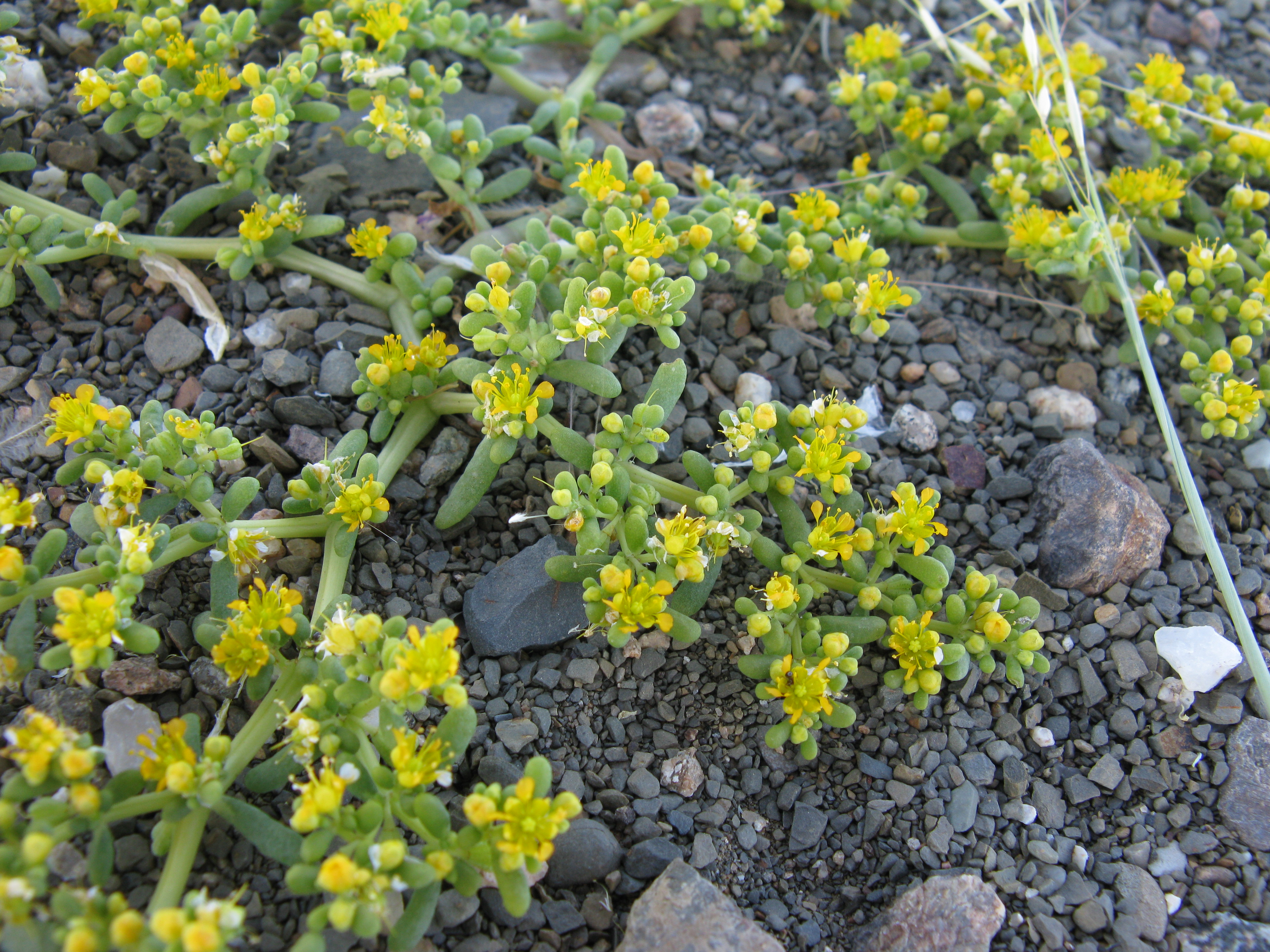

Scientific classification
- Kingdom: Plantae
- Clade: Tracheophytes
- Clade: Angiosperms
- Clade: Eudicots
- Clade: Rosids
- Order: Zygophyllales
- Family: Zygophyllaceae
- Genus: Zygophyllum
- Species: Z. simplex

Binomial name
- Zygophyllum simplex L.

Synonyms
- Fabago portulacifolius (Forssk.) Medik.; Tetraena simplex (L.) Beier & Thulin; Zygophyllum dregeanum C.Presl, nom. subnud.; Zygophyllum microcarpum E.Mey., nom. nud.; Zygophyllum obtusum Vicary; Zygophyllum portulacoides Forssk.; Zygophyllum simplex var. capense Sond.; Zygophyllum simplex var. herniarioides Chiov.; Zygophyllum simplex var. namaense Schinz; Zygophyllum stellulatum C.Sm., nom. nud.

= Zygophyllum simplex =

Species of plant

Zygophyllum simplex, synonym Tetraena simplex, commonly known as hureim or simple-leaved bean caper, is a halophytic flowering plant that is distributed in arid regions of the Western Asia and Africa. It is an annual and has a history of being used in Arabic folk medicine as an anti-inflammatory.

== Description ==
Zygophyllum simplex is a highly branched succulent plant that stands from 8 to 20 cm tall. It has fleshy, simple leaves that are oblong-cylindric in shape. It flowers from August to May and presents with yellow petals.

== Distribution and habitat ==
Zygophyllum simplex is distributed throughout West Asia and Africa. It can be found as far east as India. The most common habitats are shrub-steppes and deserts and it grows best in salty conditions. In Qatar, it is known locally as daa or hureim (also spelled harm) and is a frequent sight on rocky desert plains.
