= Zygophyllum augea =

Scientific classification
- Kingdom: Plantae
- Clade: Tracheophytes
- Clade: Angiosperms
- Clade: Eudicots
- Clade: Rosids
- Order: Zygophyllales
- Family: Zygophyllaceae
- Genus: Zygophyllum
- Species: Z. augea

Binomial name
- Zygophyllum augea Christenh. & Byng

Synonyms
- Augea capensis Thunb.; Piotes teretifolia Sol. ex Britten

Species of plant

Zygophyllum augea is a species of flowering plant in the family Zygophyllaceae, native from Namibia to the western Cape Province of South Africa. It was first described in 1798 by Carl Peter Thunberg as Augea capensis. When transferred to Zygophyllum in 2018, it was necessary to create a replacement name, as Zygophyllum capense had already been published for a different species.
