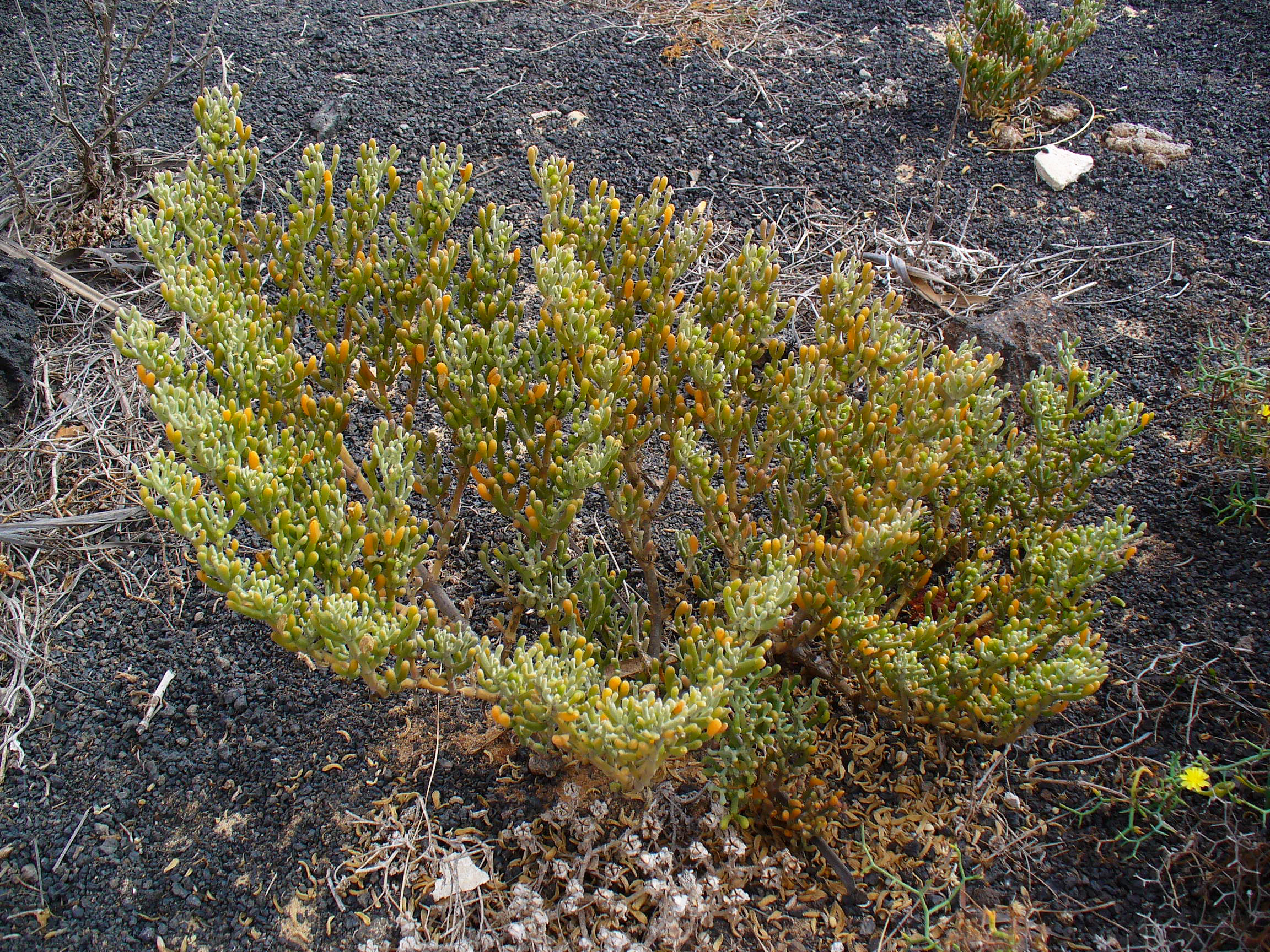

Scientific classification
- Kingdom: Plantae
- Clade: Tracheophytes
- Clade: Angiosperms
- Clade: Eudicots
- Clade: Rosids
- Order: Zygophyllales
- Family: Zygophyllaceae
- Genus: Zygophyllum
- Species: Z. fontanesii

Binomial name
- Zygophyllum fontanesii Webb & Berthel.

Synonyms
- Tetraena fontanesii (Webb & Berthel.) Beier & Thulin; Tetraena vicentina Rivas Mart., Lousã, J.C.Costa & Maria C.Duarte; Zygophyllum webbianum Coss.

= Zygophyllum fontanesii =

Species of succulent

Zygophyllum fontanesii, synonym Tetraena fontanesii, is a species of plant of the family Zygophyllaceae. It is found in Macaronesia and northwest Africa.

== Description ==
This halophile and xerophile plant can grow up to 50 cm. It has sub-cylindrical or curved leaves and flowers ranging from white to yellow. Its fruit measures 5–7 mm.

== Distribution ==
The plant occurs in the Canary Islands, Cape Verde and northwest Africa (Morocco, Western Sahara, Mauritania and Senegal).
