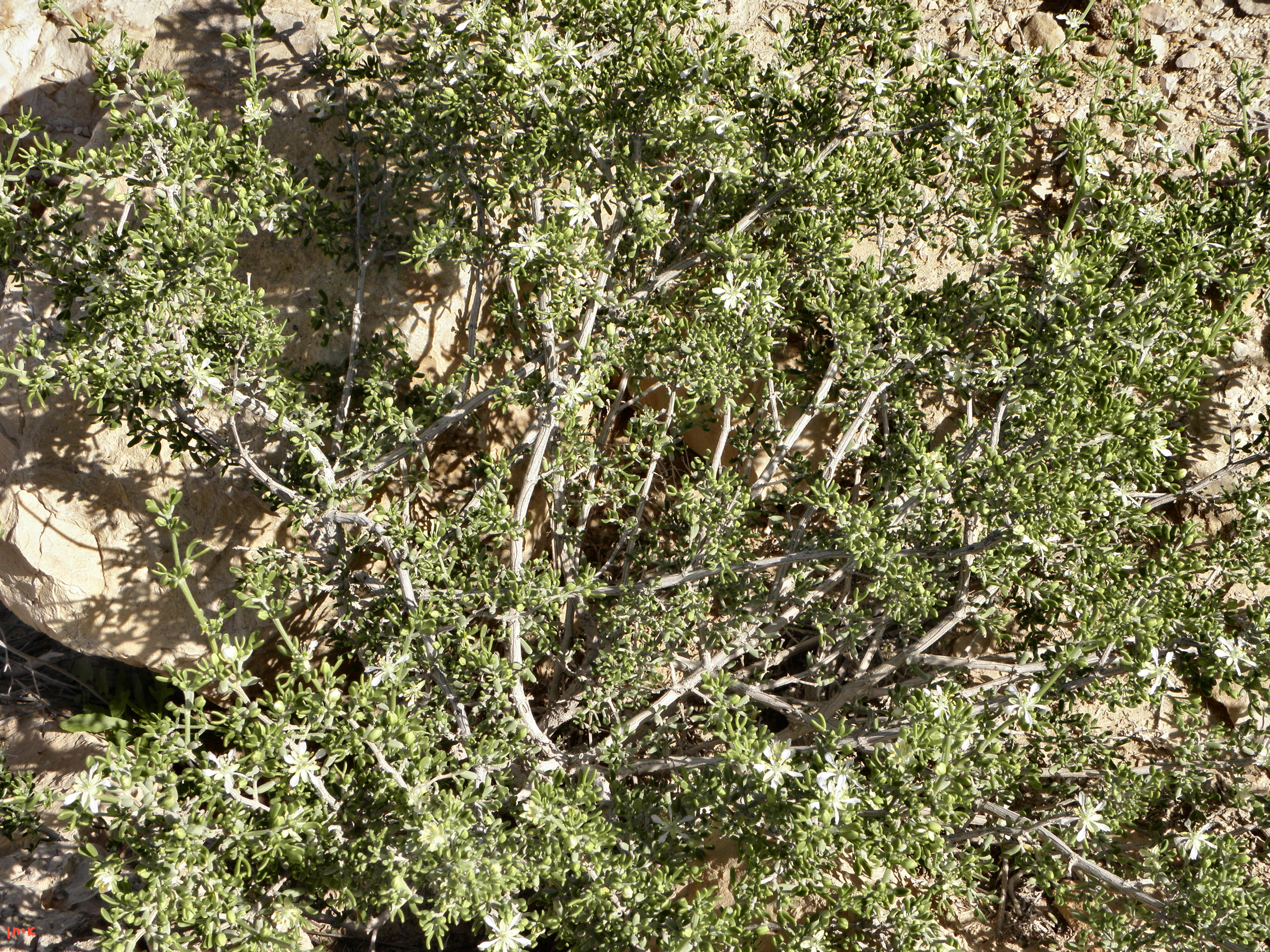
- Habit
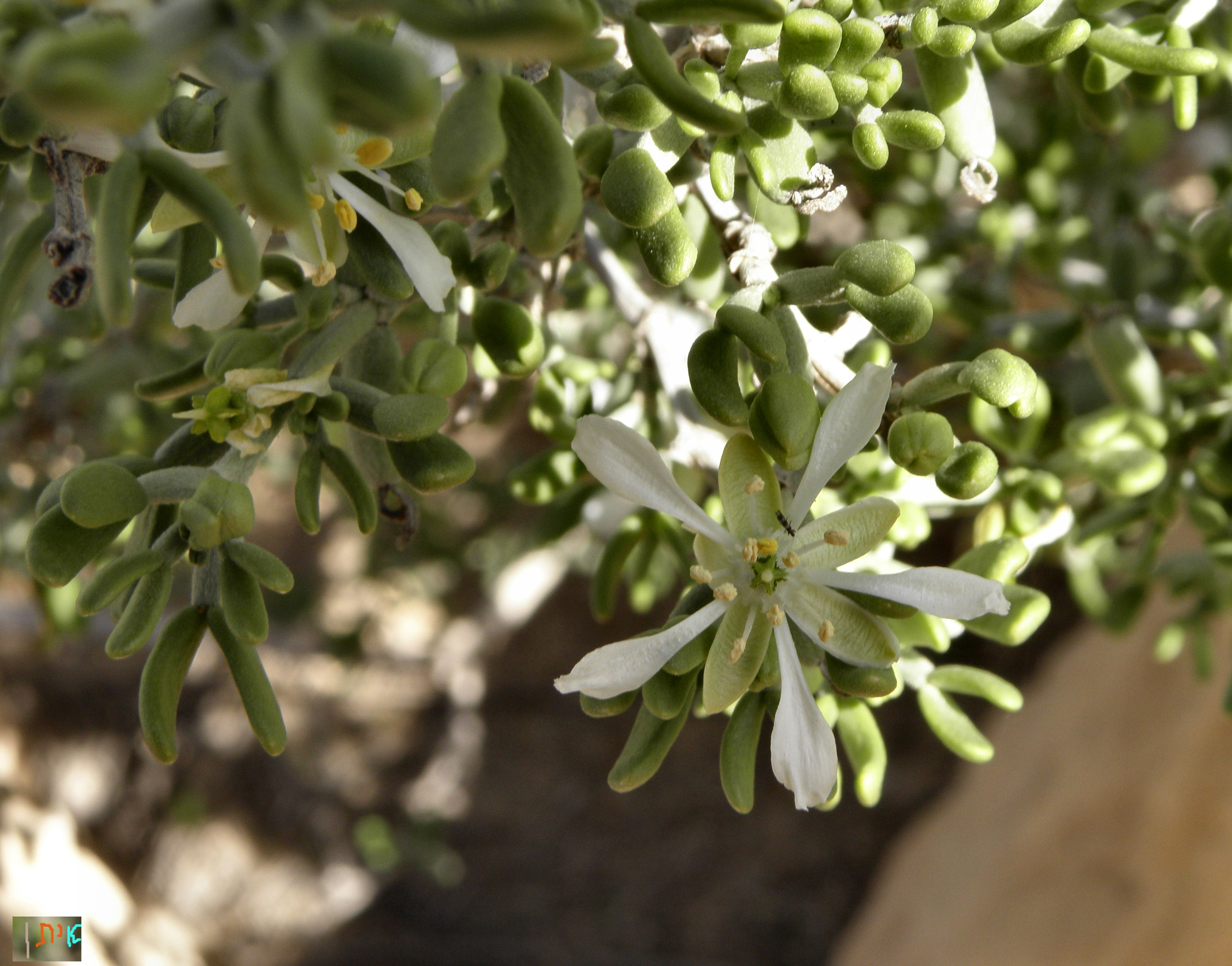
- Close-up of flower and leaves

Scientific classification
- Kingdom: Plantae
- Clade: Embryophytes
- Clade: Tracheophytes
- Clade: Angiosperms
- Clade: Eudicots
- Clade: Rosids
- Order: Zygophyllales
- Family: Zygophyllaceae
- Genus: Zygophyllum
- Species: Z. dumosum

Binomial name
- Zygophyllum dumosum Boiss.

Synonyms
- Tetraena dumosa (Boiss.) Beier & Thulin

= Zygophyllum dumosum =

Species of flowering plant

Zygophyllum dumosum (syn. Tetraena dumosa), the bushy bean-caper, is a species of flowering plant in the family Zygophyllaceae, native to Egypt, the Sinai Peninsula, and the Levant. It is a dominant shrub in the highlands of the Negev Desert.
