= Annelis Schreiber =

German botanist (1927–2010)

- Born: 1927
- Died: 2010 (aged 82–83)
- Known for: Research on plants of South West Africa, co-author of Illustrierte Flora von Mittel-Europa
- Scientific career
- Fields: Botany, Lichenology
- Workplaces: Botanische Staatssammlung München
- Author abbrev. (botany): A.Schreib.

Annelis Schreiber (1927–2010) was a German botanist, lichenologist, and author who worked at the Botanische Staatssammlung München.

She is noted her research on the plants of South West Africa, as well as her work with Gustav Hegi and Karl Heinz Rechinger in writing Illustrierte Flora von Mittel-Europa, a comprehensive flora of Central Europe. She described over 20 species.

The standard author abbreviation A.Schreib. is used to indicate this person as the author when citing a botanical name.
