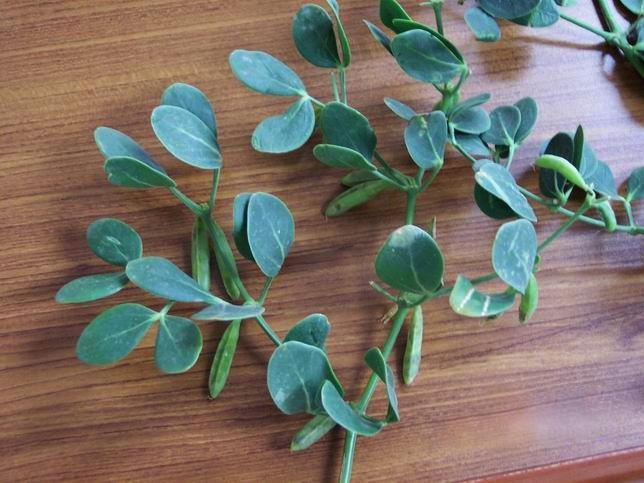
- Zygophyllum fabago
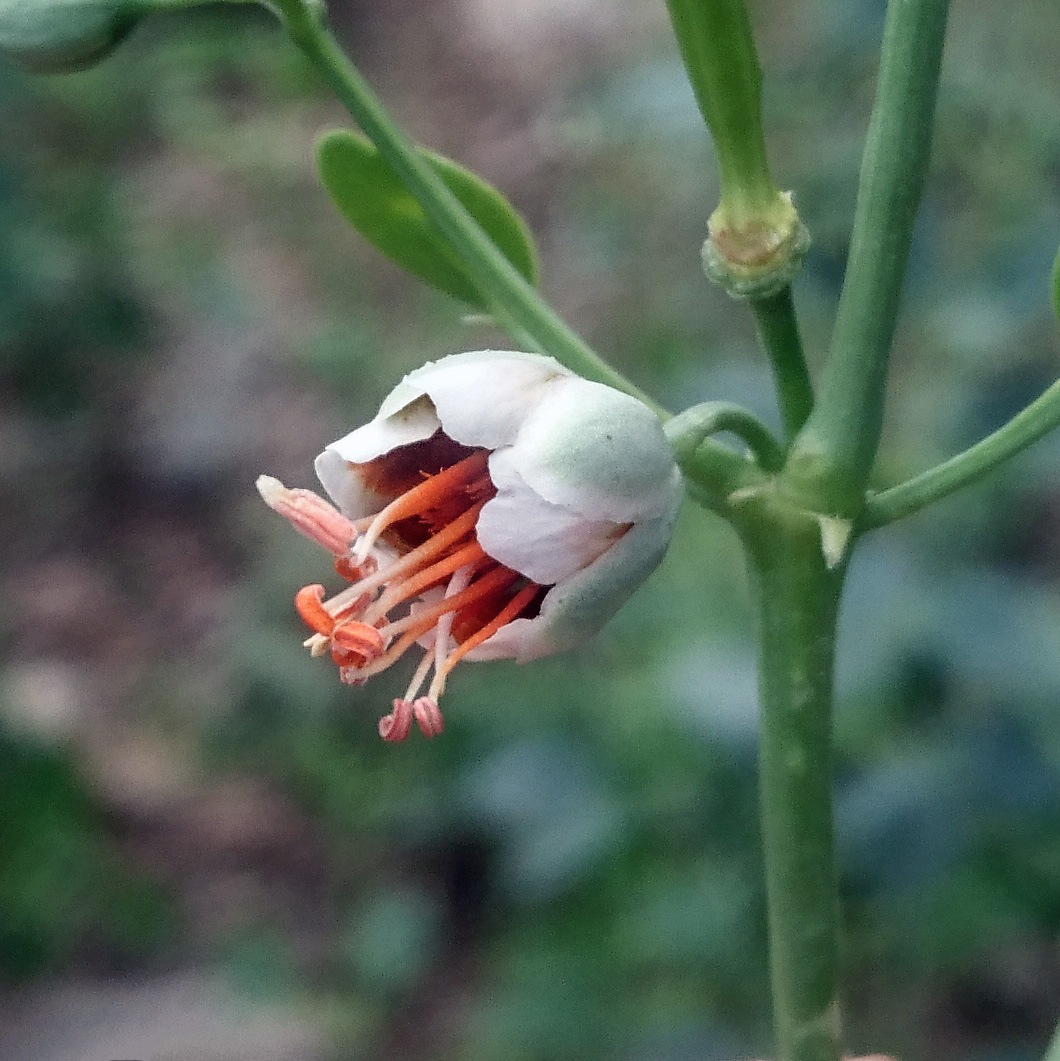
- Zygophyllum sp. flower

Scientific classification
- Kingdom: Plantae
- Clade: Embryophytes
- Clade: Tracheophytes
- Clade: Spermatophytes
- Clade: Angiosperms
- Clade: Eudicots
- Clade: Rosids
- Order: Zygophyllales
- Family: Zygophyllaceae
- Subfamily: Zygophylloideae
- Genus: Zygophyllum; L.

Species
- See text

Synonyms
- Agophyllum Neck.; Agrophyllum Neck.; Augea Thunb.; Fabago Mill.; Halimiphyllum (Engl.) Boriss.; Petrusia Baill.; Fagonia Tourn. ex L.; Piotes Sol. ex Britten; Sarcozygium (especially Zygophyllum xanthoxylon) Bunge; Tetraena Maxim.

= Zygophyllum =

Genus of flowering plants

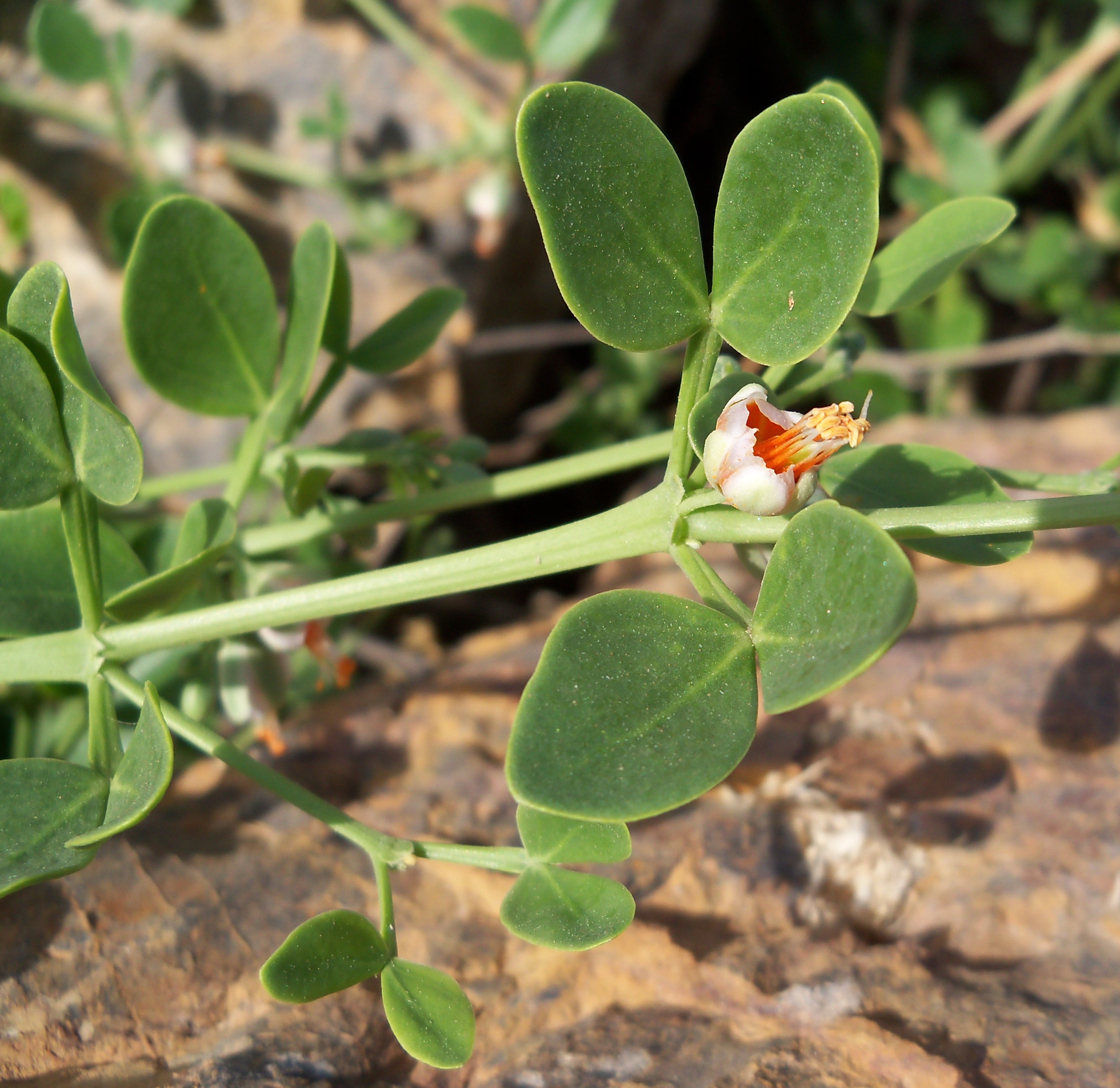
Zygophyllum fabago leaflets

Zygophyllum is the type genus of the flowering plant family Zygophyllaceae. The genus name is derived from the Ancient Greek ζυγόν (zygón), meaning "double", and φύλλον (phyllon), meaning "leaf". It refers to the leaves, each of which have two leaflets.

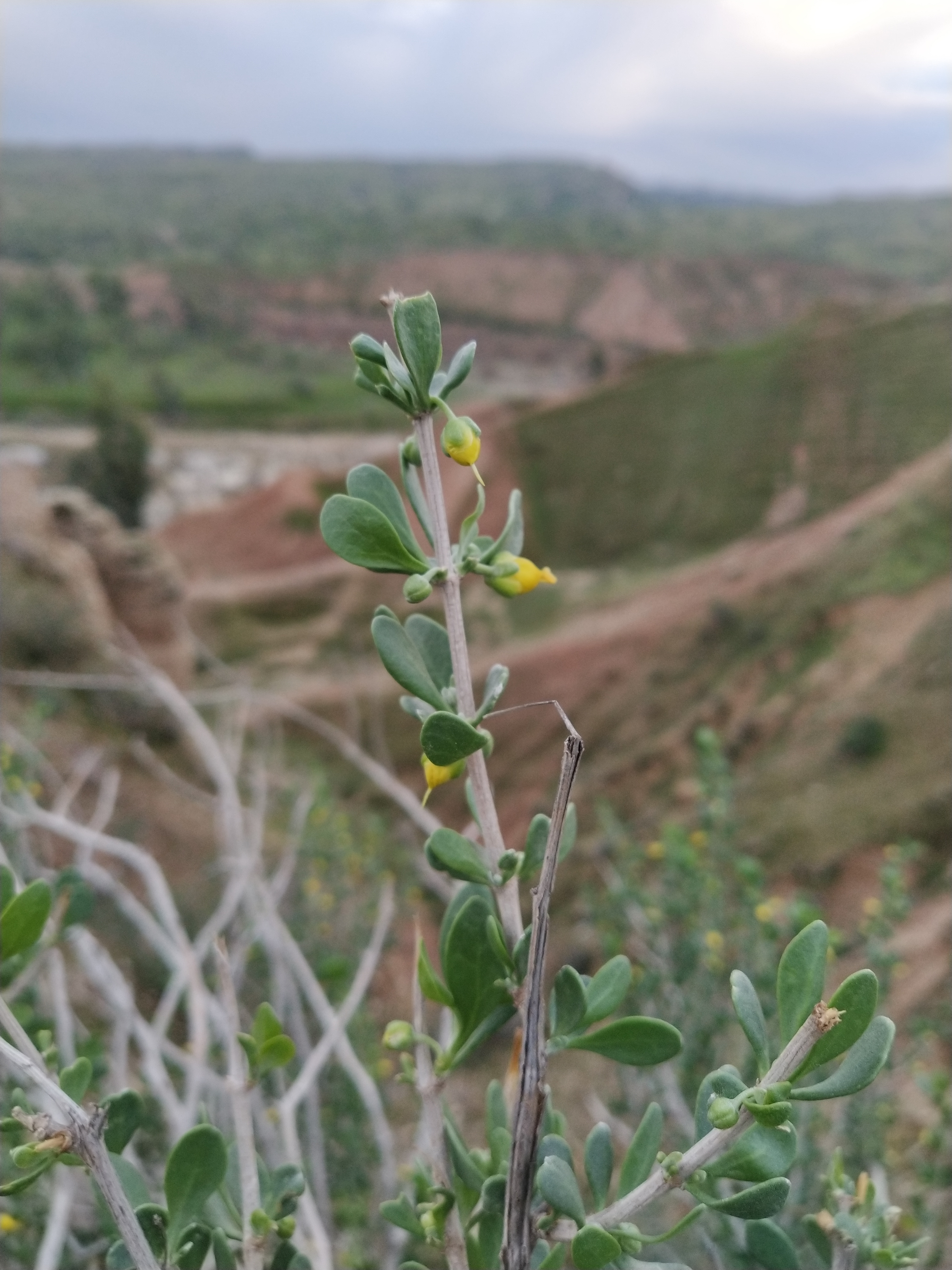
Zygophyllum atriplicoides in Behbahan County, Iran

The genus is distributed in arid and semi-arid regions of Africa, the Mediterranean Basin, central Asia, Australia, and North and South America. Molecular phylogenetic analysis suggested that as previously circumscribed, Zygophyllum was not monophyletic, and the genus was split among a number of other genera, including Augea, Fagonia, Roepera and Tetraena. As of February 2024, Plants of the World Online accepted only Roepera of these genera, regarding Augea, Fagonia and Tetraena as synonyms of Zygophyllum.

== Species ==
As of April 2023, Plants of the World Online accepted 117 species (including those other sources place in Augea, Fagonia and Tetraena):

- Zygophyllum acerosum (Boiss.) Christenh. & Byng
- Zygophyllum aegyptium Hosny
- Zygophyllum album L.f.
- Zygophyllum applanatum Van Zyl
- Zygophyllum arabicum (L.) Christenh. & Byng
- Zygophyllum atriplicoides Fisch. & C.A.Mey.
- Zygophyllum augea Christenh. & Byng
- Zygophyllum balchaschense Boriss.
- Zygophyllum betpakdalense Golosk. & Semiotr.
- Zygophyllum borissovae Beier & Thulin
- Zygophyllum brachypterum Kar. & Kir.
- Zygophyllum bruguieri (DC.) Christenh. & Byng
- Zygophyllum bucharicum B.Fedtsch.
- Zygophyllum californicum (Benth.) Christenh. & Byng
- Zygophyllum charoides (Chiov.) Christenh. & Byng
- Zygophyllum chilense (Hook. & Arn.) Christenh. & Byng
- Zygophyllum chrysopteron Retief
- Zygophyllum clavatum Schltr. & Diels
- Zygophyllum coccineum L.
- Zygophyllum cornutum Coss.
- Zygophyllum creticum (L.) Christenh. & Byng
- Zygophyllum cuspidatum Boriss.
- Zygophyllum cylindrifolium Schinz
- Zygophyllum darvasicum Boriss.
- Zygophyllum decumbens Delile
- Zygophyllum densispinum (Beier & Thulin) Christenh. & Byng
- Zygophyllum densum (I.M.Johnst.) Christenh. & Byng
- Zygophyllum dregeanum Sond.
- Zygophyllum dumosum Boiss.
- Zygophyllum eichwaldii C.A.Mey.
- Zygophyllum fabago L.
- Zygophyllum fabagoides Popov
- Zygophyllum fontanesii Webb & Berthel.
- Zygophyllum furcatum C.A.Mey.
- Zygophyllum gaetulum Emb. & Maire
- Zygophyllum geslinii Coss.
- Zygophyllum giessii Merxm. & A.Schreib.
- Zygophyllum glutinosum (Delile) Christenh. & Byng
- Zygophyllum gobicum Maxim.
- Zygophyllum gontscharovii Boriss.
- Zygophyllum gypsophilum (Beier & Thulin) Christenh. & Byng
- Zygophyllum hadramauticum (Beier & Thulin) Christenh. & Byng
- Zygophyllum hamiense Schweinf.
- Zygophyllum harpago (Emb. & Maire) Christenh. & Byng
- Zygophyllum heterocladum Rech.f. & Patzak
- Zygophyllum iliense Popov
- Zygophyllum indicum (Burm.f.) Christenh. & Byng
- Zygophyllum jaxarticum Popov
- Zygophyllum kansuense Y.X.Liou
- Zygophyllum karatavicum Boriss.
- Zygophyllum kaschgaricum Boriss.
- Zygophyllum kegense Boriss.
- Zygophyllum kopalense Boriss.
- Zygophyllum laeve (Standl.) Christenh. & Byng
- Zygophyllum lahovarii (Volkens & Schweinf.) Christenh. & Byng
- Zygophyllum latistipulatum (Beier & Thulin) Christenh. & Byng
- Zygophyllum lehmannianum Bunge
- Zygophyllum loczyi Kanitz
- Zygophyllum longicapsulare Schinz
- Zygophyllum longistipulatum Schinz
- Zygophyllum luntii (Baker) Christenh. & Byng
- Zygophyllum macropodum Boriss.
- Zygophyllum madagascariense (Baill.) Stauffer
- Zygophyllum madecassum H.Perrier
- Zygophyllum mahranum (Beier) Christenh. & Byng
- Zygophyllum mandavillei Hadidi
- Zygophyllum mayanum (Schltdl.) Christenh. & Byng
- Zygophyllum melongena Bunge
- Zygophyllum microcarpum Licht. ex Cham.
- Zygophyllum migiurtinorum Chiov.
- Zygophyllum miniatum Cham.
- Zygophyllum minutistipulum (Engl.) Christenh. & Byng
- Zygophyllum molle (Delile) Christenh. & Byng
- Zygophyllum mongolicum (Maxim.) Christenh. & Byng
- Zygophyllum mucronatum Maxim.
- Zygophyllum neglectum Grubov
- Zygophyllum obliquum Popov
- Zygophyllum olivieri (DC.) Christenh. & Byng
- Zygophyllum orientale (C.Presl) Christenh. & Byng
- Zygophyllum ovigerum Fisch. & C.A.Mey. ex Bunge
- Zygophyllum oxianum Boriss.
- Zygophyllum oxycarpum Popov
- Zygophyllum pachyacanthum (Rydb.) Christenh. & Byng
- Zygophyllum palmeri (Vasey & Rose) Christenh. & Byng
- Zygophyllum pamiricum Grubov
- Zygophyllum paulayanum (J.Wagner & Vierh.) Christenh. & Byng
- Zygophyllum pinnatum Cham.
- Zygophyllum potaninii Maxim.
- Zygophyllum prismaticum Chiov.
- Zygophyllum prismatocarpum Sond.
- Zygophyllum procumbens Adamson
- Zygophyllum propinquum Decne.
- Zygophyllum pterocarpum Bunge
- Zygophyllum pterocaule Van Zyl
- Zygophyllum qatarense Hadidi
- Zygophyllum retrofractum Thunb.
- Zygophyllum rigidum Schinz
- Zygophyllum rosowii Bunge
- Zygophyllum scabrum (Forssk.) Christenh. & Byng
- Zygophyllum scoparium (Brandegee) Christenh. & Byng
- Zygophyllum simplex L.
- Zygophyllum sinkiangense Y.X.Liou
- Zygophyllum smithii Hadidi
- Zygophyllum somalense Hadidi
- Zygophyllum spinosissimum (Blatt. & Hallb.) Christenh. & Byng
- Zygophyllum stapffii Schinz
- Zygophyllum steropterum Schrenk
- Zygophyllum subinerme (Boiss.) Christenh. & Byng
- Zygophyllum subtrijugum C.A.Mey.
- Zygophyllum sulcatum Huysst.
- Zygophyllum taldykurganicum Boriss.
- Zygophyllum tenue R.Glover
- Zygophyllum trialatum Blatt. & Hallb.
- Zygophyllum turcomanicum Fisch. ex Boiss.
- Zygophyllum villosum (D.M.Porter) Christenh. & Byng
- Zygophyllum xanthoxylum (Bunge) Maxim.
- Zygophyllum zilloides (Humbert) Christenh. & Byng
