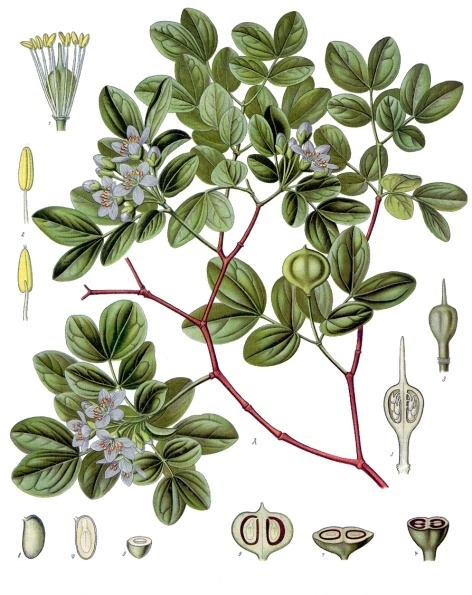
- Guaiacum officinale

Scientific classification
- Kingdom: Plantae
- Clade: Tracheophytes
- Clade: Angiosperms
- Clade: Eudicots
- Clade: Rosids
- Clade: Fabids
- Order: Zygophyllales; Link 1829

Families
- Zygophyllaceae; Krameriaceae

= Zygophyllales =

Order of dicotyledonous plants

The Zygophyllales are an order of dicotyledonous plants, comprising the following two families:

- Family Zygophyllaceae
- Family Krameriaceae

According to the Angiosperm Phylogeny Group (APG II) both families are unplaced to order, but nevertheless included in the Eurosids I. The APG III system of 2009, however, recognized this order. Even if the monogeneric family Krameriaceae shares few common traits with the family Zygophyllaceae, researchers see little advantage in keeping it as a separate family (e.g. Sheahan and Chase). The name Zygophyllales can be used if one finds it appropriate to place both families into an order. The order remains unchanged in the APG IV system.

Under the Cronquist system, the Zygophyllaceae were included within the Sapindales, and the Krameriaceae within the Polygalales.

== List of families ==
Families
Family and a common name	Type genus and etymology	Total genera; global distribution	Description and uses
Krameriaceae (ratany family)	Krameria, for Wilhelm Heinrich Kramer (1724–1765)	1 genus, in southern North America and dry parts of South America	Parasitic shrubs and herbaceous perennials. Krameria triandra is used as an astringent in mouthwash and toothpaste.
Zygophyllaceae (twinleaf family)	Zygophyllum, from Greek for "yoked leaves"	22 genera, scattered worldwide, mostly in dry tropical to temperate zones	Shrubs, trees and herbaceous plants, frequently with jointed branches, sometimes with thorns. Guaiacum yields exceptionally hard lumber.
