= Dark grass blue =

Dark grass blue may refer to three butterfly species:

- Zizeeria knysna
- Zizeeria karsandra
- Zizina antanossa
