= Leioproctus exleyae =

Scientific classification
- Kingdom: Animalia
- Phylum: Arthropoda
- Clade: Pancrustacea
- Class: Insecta
- Order: Hymenoptera
- Family: Colletidae
- Genus: Leioproctus
- Species: L. exleyae

Binomial name
- Leioproctus exleyae Maynard 2013

Species of bee

Leioproctus exleyae, or Leioproctus (Charicolletes) exleyae, is a species of bee in the family Colletidae and subfamily Colletinae. It is endemic to Australia. It was described by Australian entomologist Glynn Maynard in 2013.

== Etymology ==
The specific epithet exleyae honours entomologist Elizabeth Exley.

== Description ==
Female body length is about 10 mm, male body length 9 mm. Integumental colouration is orange to mottled orange to black. The hair is mostly white.

== Distribution and habitat ==
The species occurs in eastern inland Australia. The type locality is 120 km north of Innamincka, South Australia.

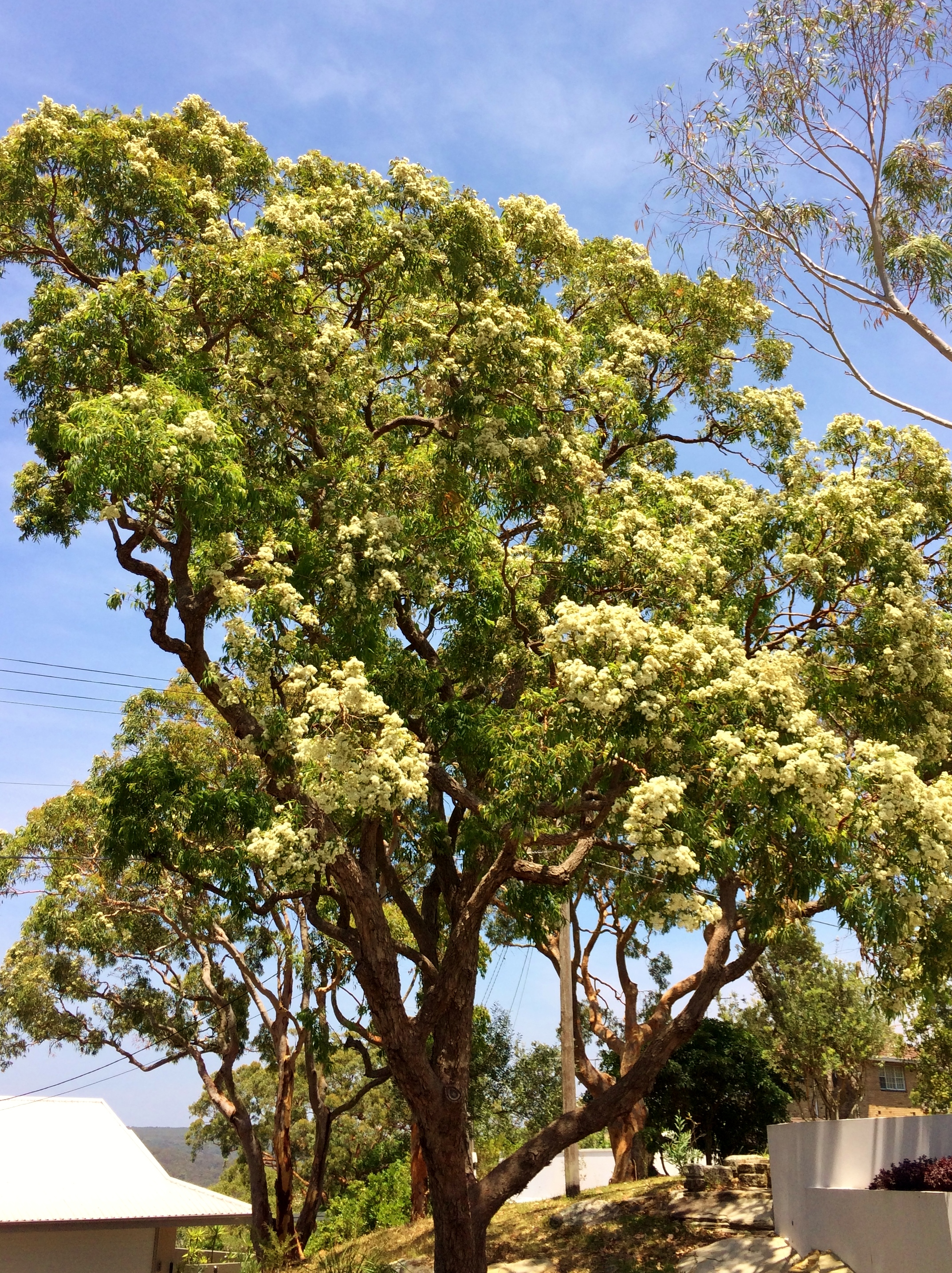
Angophora floribunda (rough-barked apple), a forage plant of the bees, in flower

== Behaviour ==
The adults are flying mellivores. Flowering plants visited by the bees include Portulaca oleracea, Tribulus occidentalis, Eucalyptus argillacea, Eucalyptus melanophloia, Eucalyptus largiflorens, Eucalyptus populnea, Eucalyptus intertexta and Angophora floribunda, as well as Acacia species.

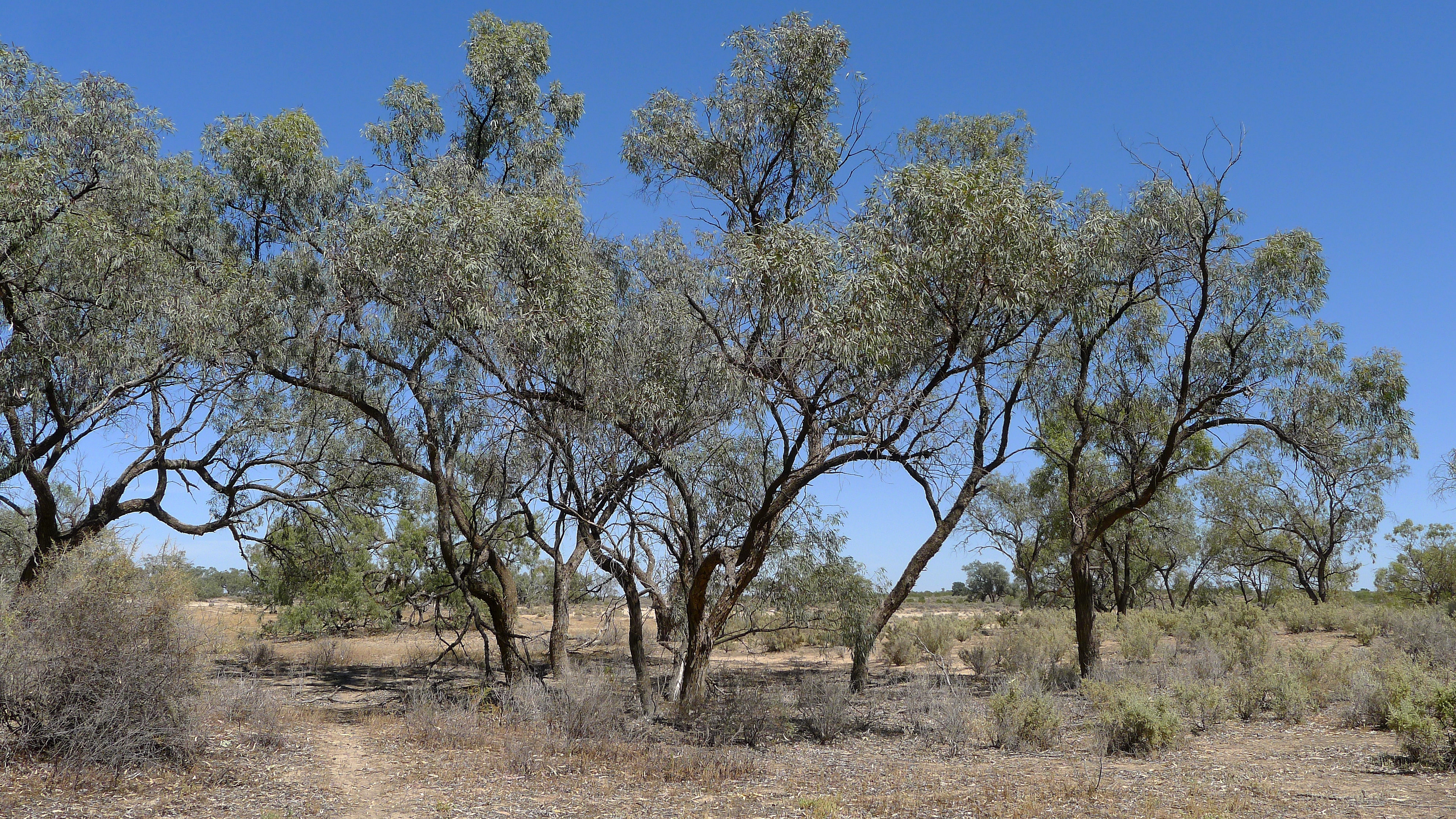
Eucalyptus largiflorens (black box), a forage plant of the bees
