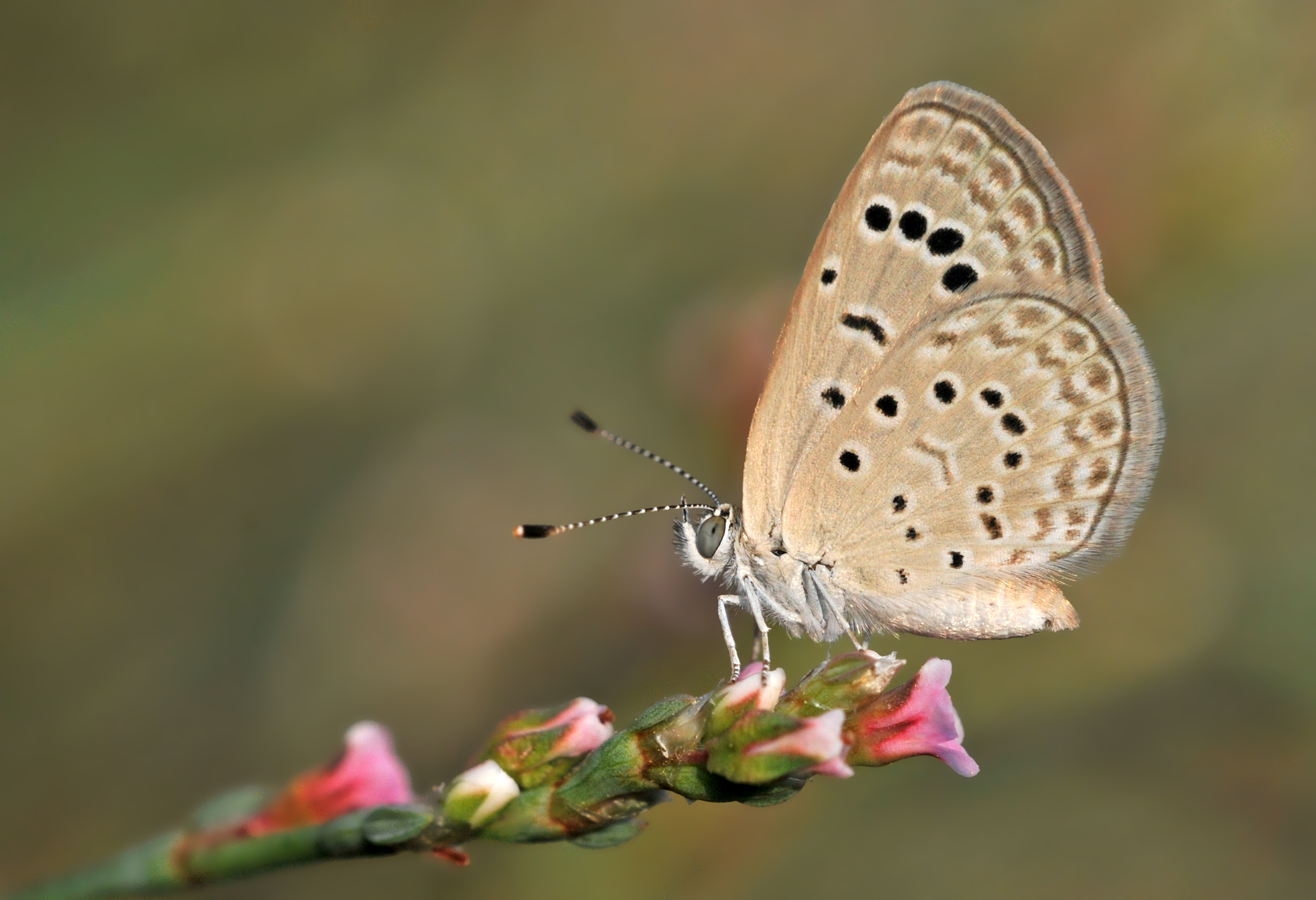

Conservation status
- Least Concern (IUCN 3.1)

Scientific classification
- Domain: Eukaryota
- Kingdom: Animalia
- Phylum: Arthropoda
- Class: Insecta
- Order: Lepidoptera
- Family: Lycaenidae
- Genus: Zizeeria
- Species: Z. karsandra

Binomial name
- Zizeeria karsandra (Moore, 1865)

Synonyms
- Polyommatus karsandra Moore, 1865

= Zizeeria karsandra =

Dark grass blue

Species of butterfly

Zizeeria karsandra, the dark grass blue, is a small butterfly first described by Frederic Moore in 1865. It is found from the southern Mediterranean, in a broad band to India, Sri Lanka, the Andaman and Nicobar islands, Myanmar, Thailand, Malaysia, Yunnan, Indonesia, the Philippines, Arabia, United Arab Emirates, Saudi Arabia and Oman, New Guinea and northern and eastern Australia. It belongs to the lycaenids or blues family, and the tribe Polyommatini.

== Description ==
Frederic Moore described this species on 1865 as: "Upperside purple-brown. Underside greyish brown, exterior margins defined by a brown line: fore wing with a spot within discoidal cell, a discocellular streak, a spot above it, and a transverse discal series of six spots black, each encircled with white; a marginal and submarginal row of pale brown, white-bordered lunules: hind wing with a series of twelve black spots, and a pale discocellular streak, encircled with white; a marginal row of pale brown, whitish-encircled spots, and a submarginal row of whitish lunules: cilia greyish brown."

== Food plants ==
The recorded food plants include:

- Zornia diphylla
- Amaranthus viridis (in association with the ant Tapinoma melanocephalum)
- Amaranthus tricolor
- Amaranthus viridis
- Melilotus indica
- Medicago sativa
- Zornia diphylla
- Trifolium alexandrinum
- Glinus lotoides
- Tribulus cistoides
- Tribulus terrestris

== Gallery ==
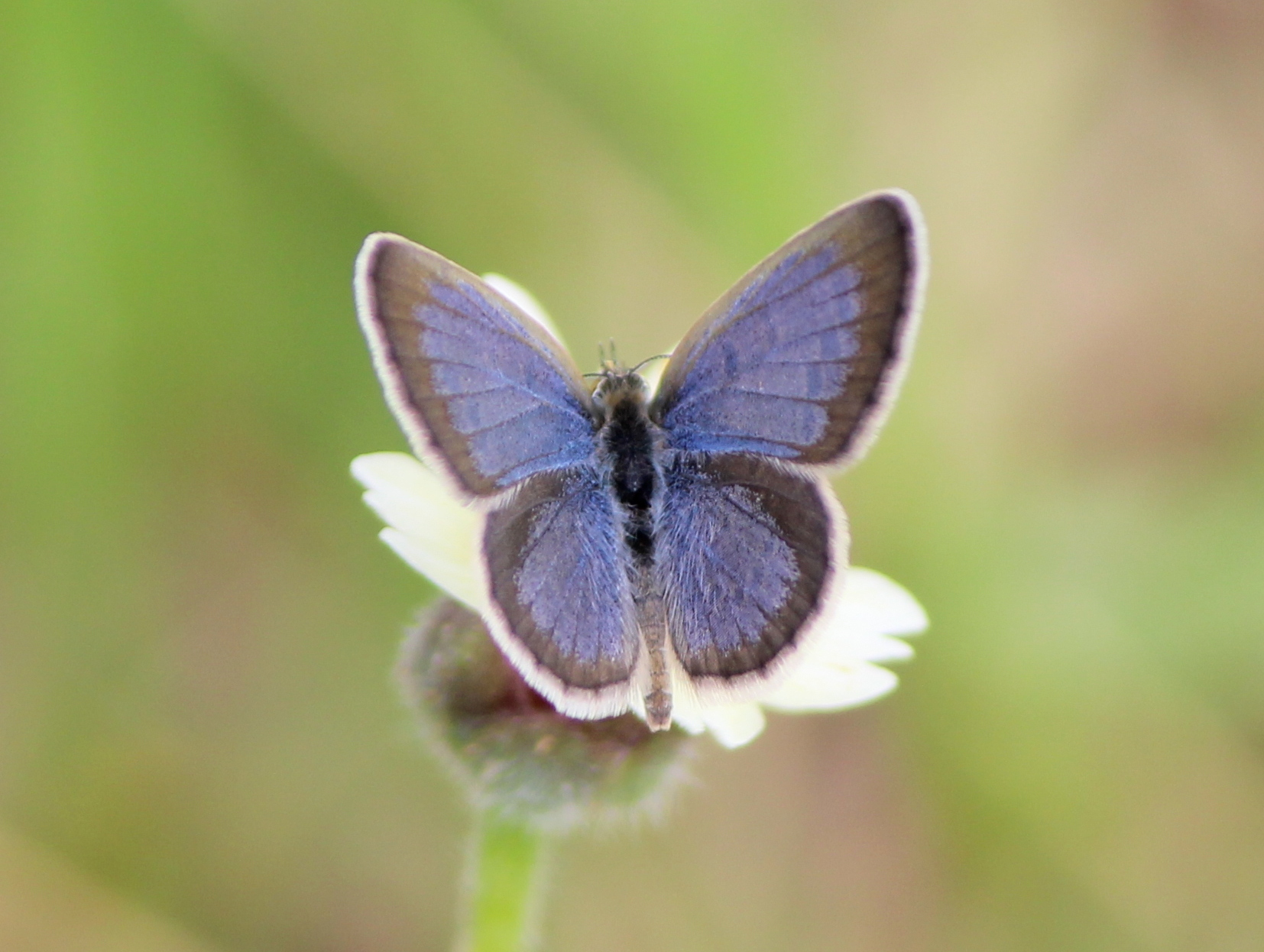
Upperside (male)

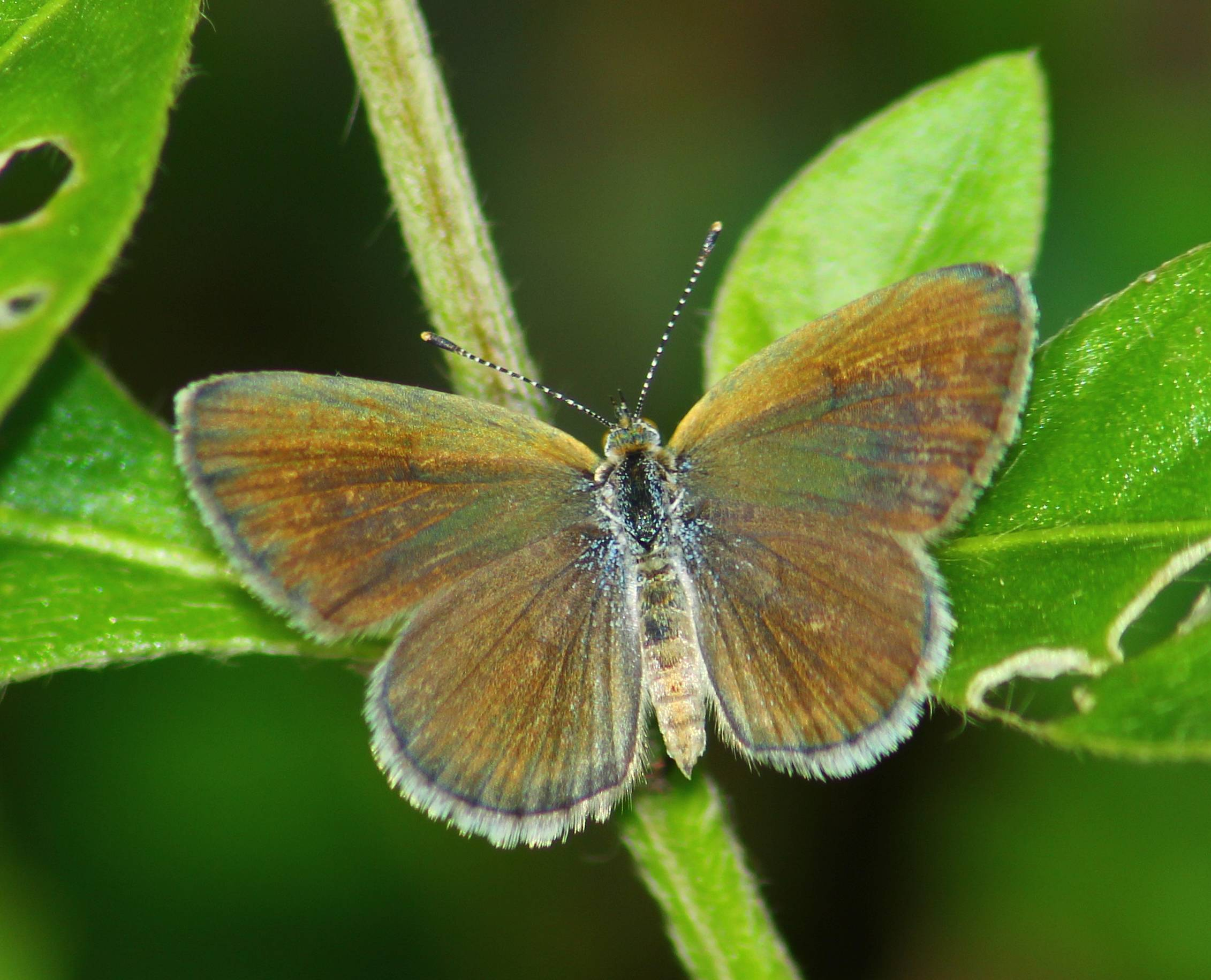
Upperside (female)

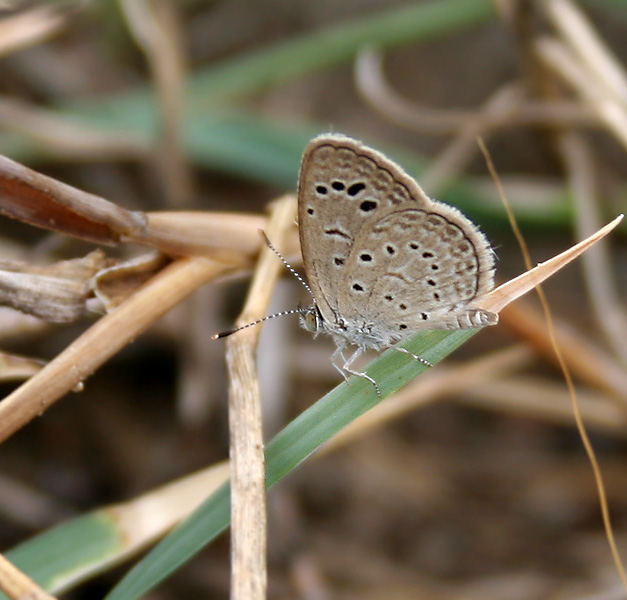
In Hyderabad, India

== See also ==
- List of butterflies of India (Lycaenidae)
