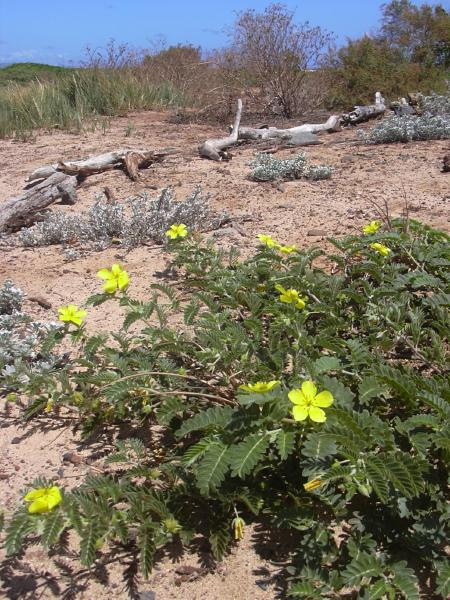
- Tribulus cistoides in flower

Scientific classification
- Kingdom: Plantae
- Clade: Embryophytes
- Clade: Tracheophytes
- Clade: Angiosperms
- Clade: Eudicots
- Clade: Rosids
- Order: Zygophyllales
- Family: Zygophyllaceae
- Genus: Tribulus; L.

= Tribulus =

Genus of flowering plants

Tribulus is a genus of plants in the family Zygophyllaceae and found in diverse climates and soils worldwide from latitudes 35°S to 47°N. The best-known member is T. terrestris (puncture vine), a widespread invasive species and weed.

Tribulus species are perennial, but some grow as annuals in colder climates. The leaves are opposite and compound. The flowers are perfect (hermaphroditic) and insect-pollinated, with fivefold symmetry. The ovary is divided into locules that are in turn divided by "false septa" (the latter distinguish Tribulus from other members of its family).

Tribulus omanense is the national flower of the United Arab Emirates. There are many Tribulus species still unresolved and needing further study.

== List of accepted species ==
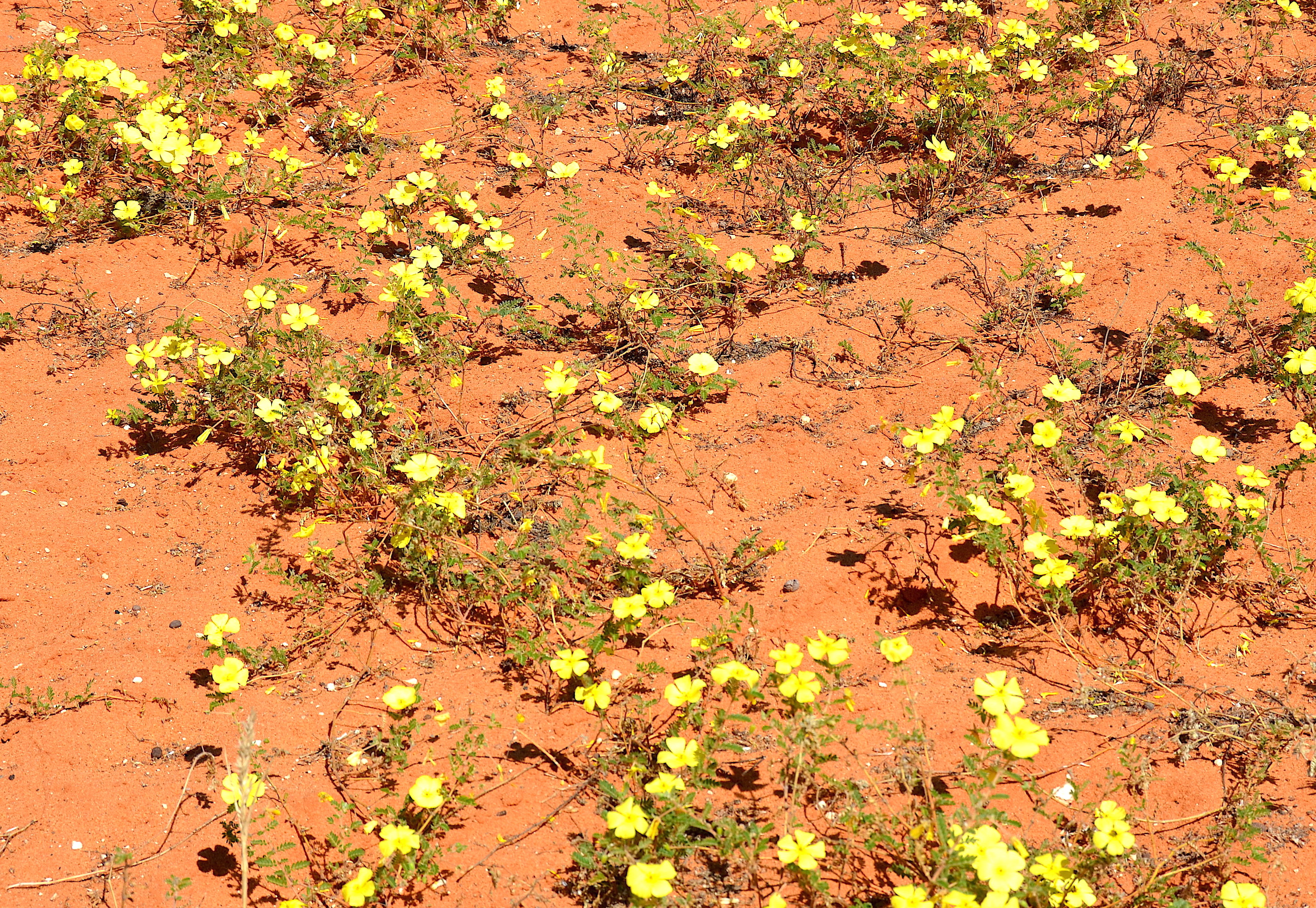
Tribulus zeyheri growing in the Kalahari Desert in Namibia

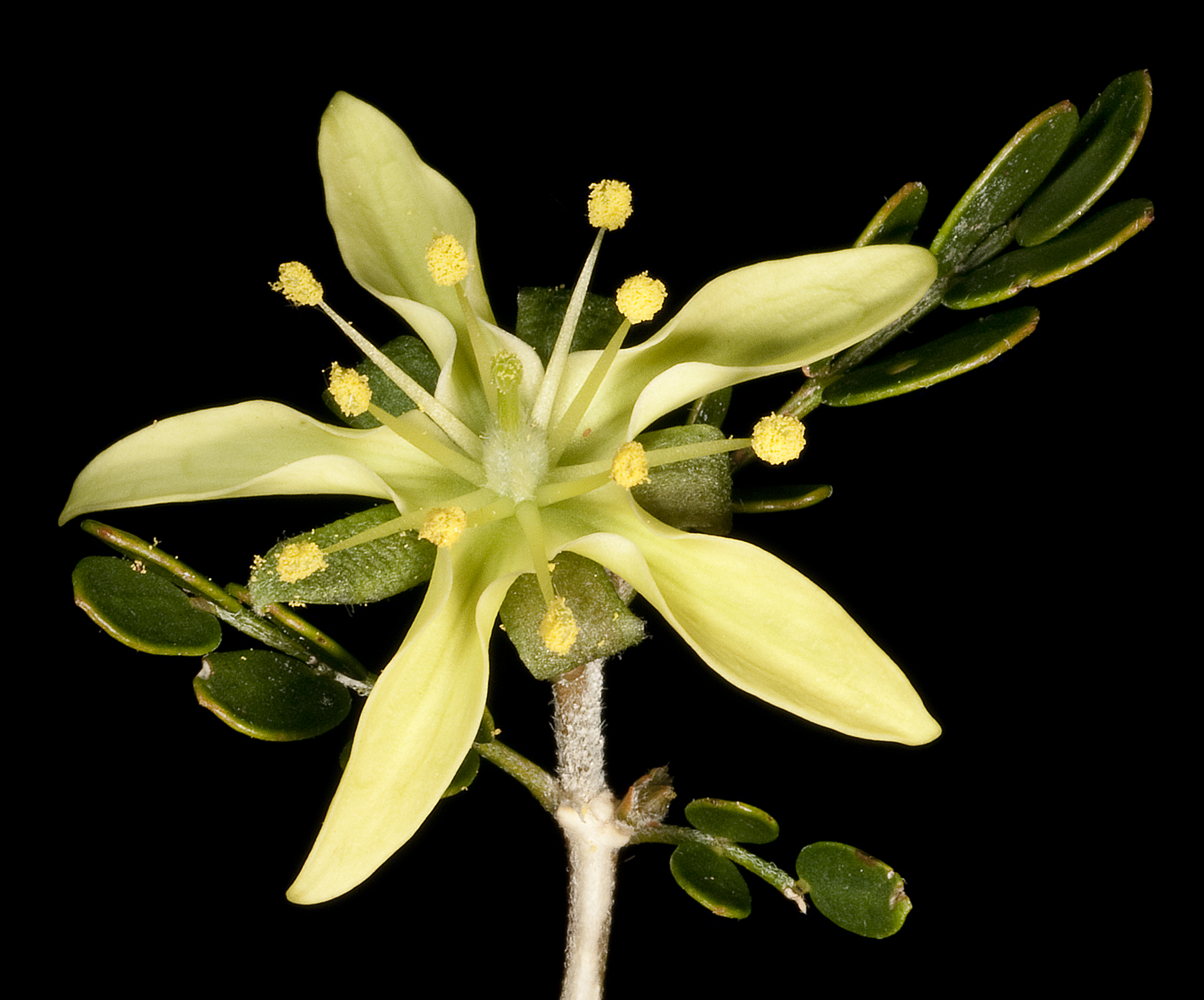
Tribulus platypterus

As of August 2026, Plants of the World Online accepts 30 species.

- Tribulus adelacanthus R.M.Barker
- Tribulus arabicus Hosni
- Tribulus astrocarpus F.Muell.
- Tribulus bimucronatus Viv.
- Tribulus cistoides L.
- Tribulus cristatus C.Presl
- Tribulus echinops Kers
- Tribulus eichlerianus K.L.Wilson
- Tribulus excrucians Wawra
- Tribulus forrestii F.Muell.
- Tribulus hirsutus Benth.
- Tribulus hystrix R.Br.
- Tribulus incanus Hosni
- Tribulus kaiseri Hosni
- Tribulus macrocarpus F.Muell. ex Benth.
- Tribulus macropterus Boiss.
- Tribulus megistopterus Kralik
- Tribulus micrococcus Domin
- Tribulus minutus Leichh. ex Benth.
- Tribulus mollis Ehrenb. ex Schweinf.
- Tribulus occidentalis R.Br.
- Tribulus parvispinus C.Presl
- Tribulus pentandrus Forssk.
- Tribulus platypterus Benth.
- Tribulus ranunculiflorus F.Muell.
- Tribulus spurius Kralik
- Tribulus suberosus H.Eichler ex R.M.Barker
- Tribulus subramanyamii P.Singh, G.S.Giri & V.Singh
- Tribulus terrestris L.
- Tribulus zeyheri Sond.

== Uses ==
T. terrestris has been cultivated to inhibit soil erosion and to improve soil moisture, texture, and water-holding capability in deserts and barren lands. Although T. terrestris extracts have been used in traditional medicine and as a dietary supplement for bodybuilders, there is no high-quality clinical evidence that it is effective or safe for these purposes.
