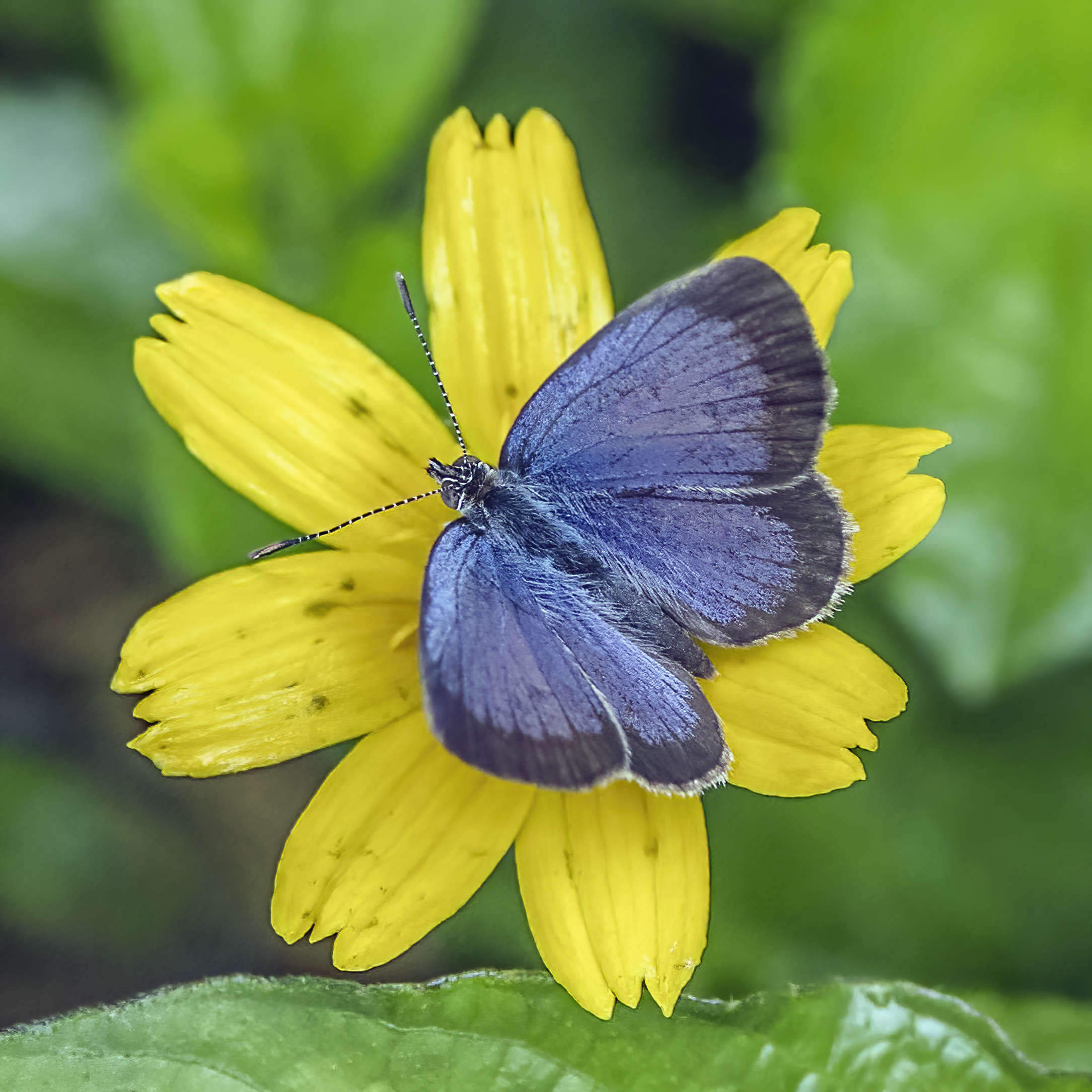
- Male
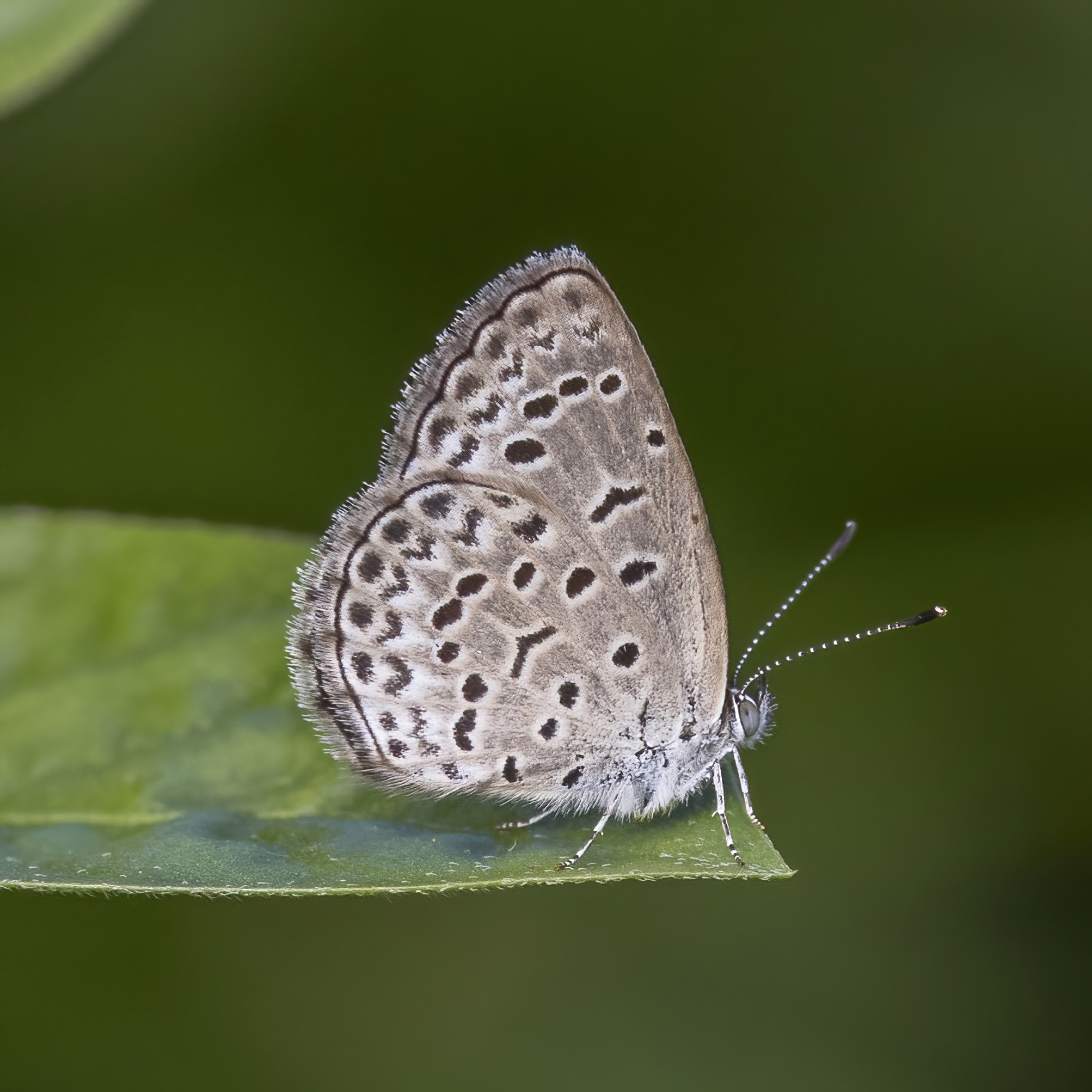
- both in São Tomé and Príncipe

Scientific classification
- Kingdom: Animalia
- Phylum: Arthropoda
- Clade: Pancrustacea
- Class: Insecta
- Order: Lepidoptera
- Family: Lycaenidae
- Genus: Zizeeria
- Species: Z. knysna

Binomial name
- Zizeeria knysna (Trimen 1862)

Synonyms
- Lycaena knysna Trimen, 1862; Papilio lysimon Hübner, 1803; Zizera lysimon; Zizeeria lysimon

= Zizeeria knysna =

African grass blue

Species of butterfly

Zizeeria knysna, the dark grass blue or African grass blue, is a species of blue butterfly (Lycaenidae) found in Africa, on Cyprus and the Iberian Peninsula.

The wingspan is 18–23 mm for males and 21–26 mm for females. The butterfly flies nearly year-round.

The larvae feed on Medicago, Melilotus, Acanthyllis, Armeria delicatula, Polygonum equisetiforme, Tribulus terrestris and Oxalis.

Torben Larsen developed a species numbering system for his 2005 publication Butterflies of West Africa. This species is #635. The 'Larsen' numbers have since been used with permission in A Sharp Eye on Butterflies of Ghana.

== Gallery ==
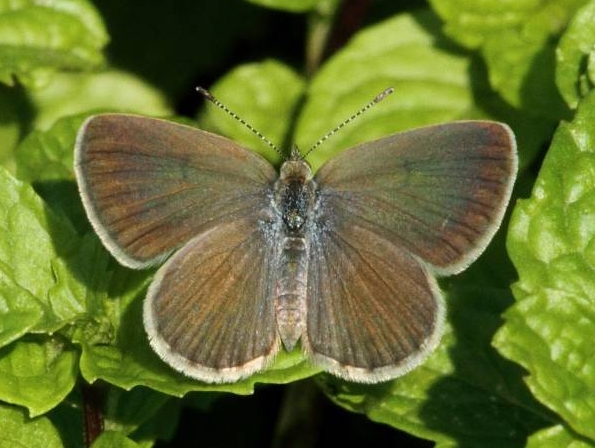

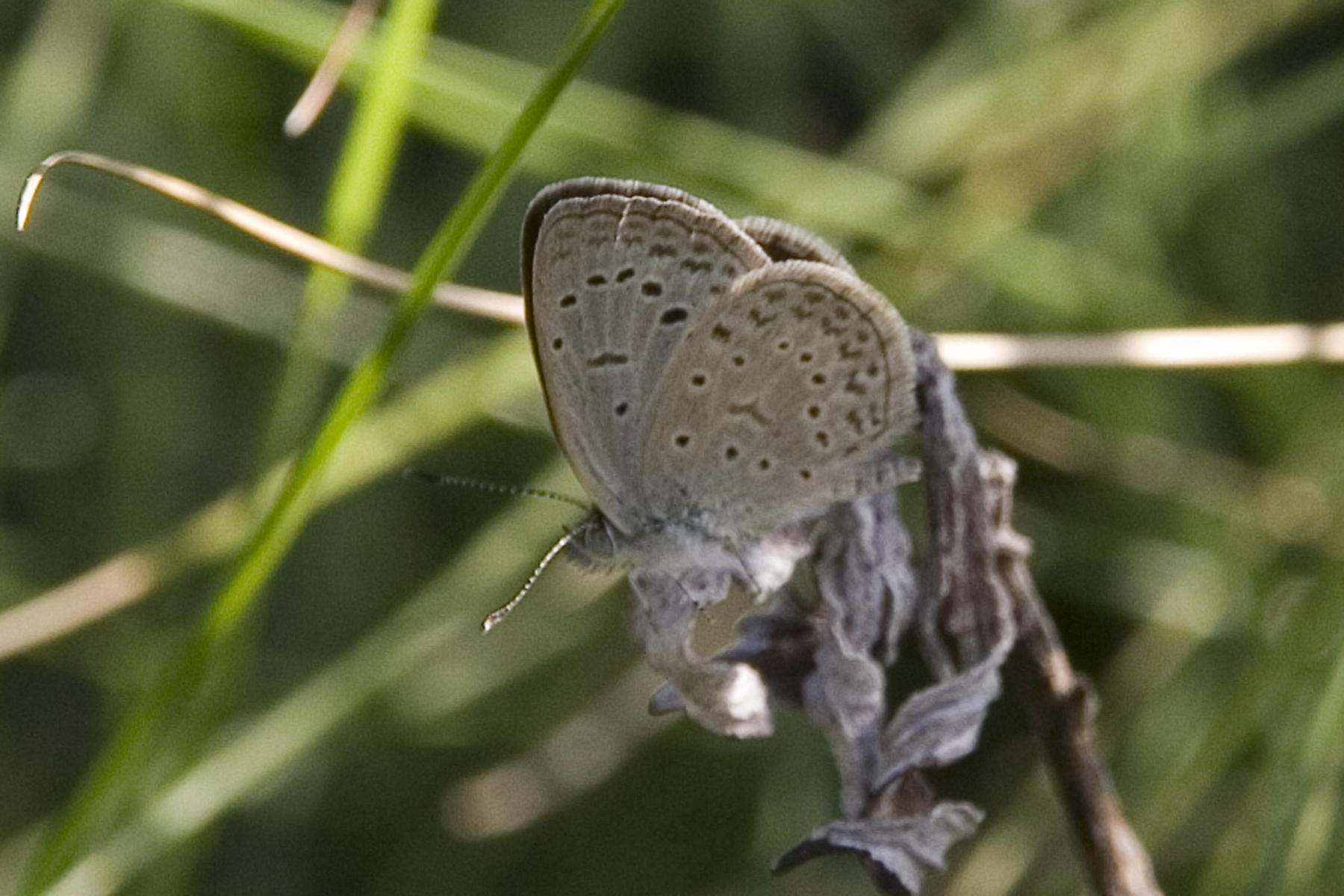

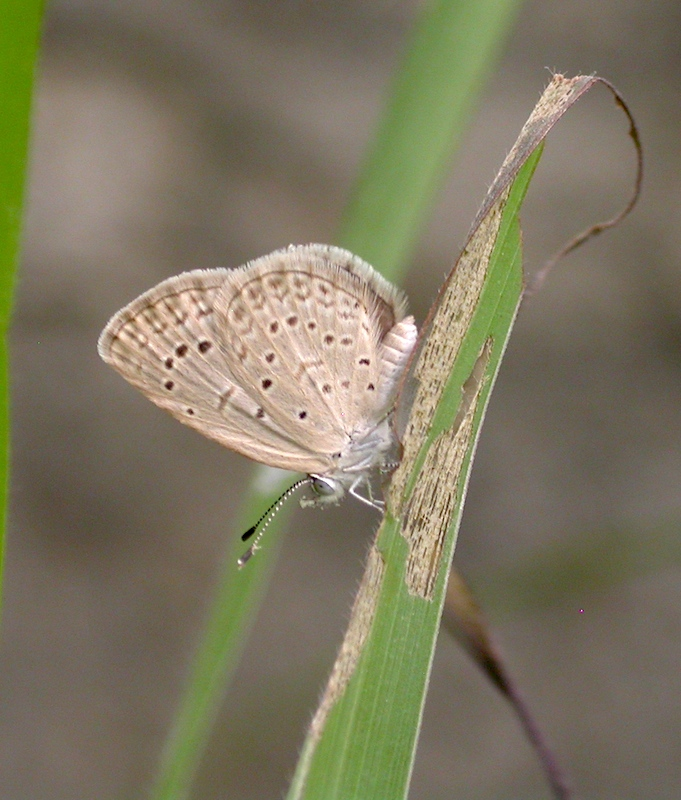

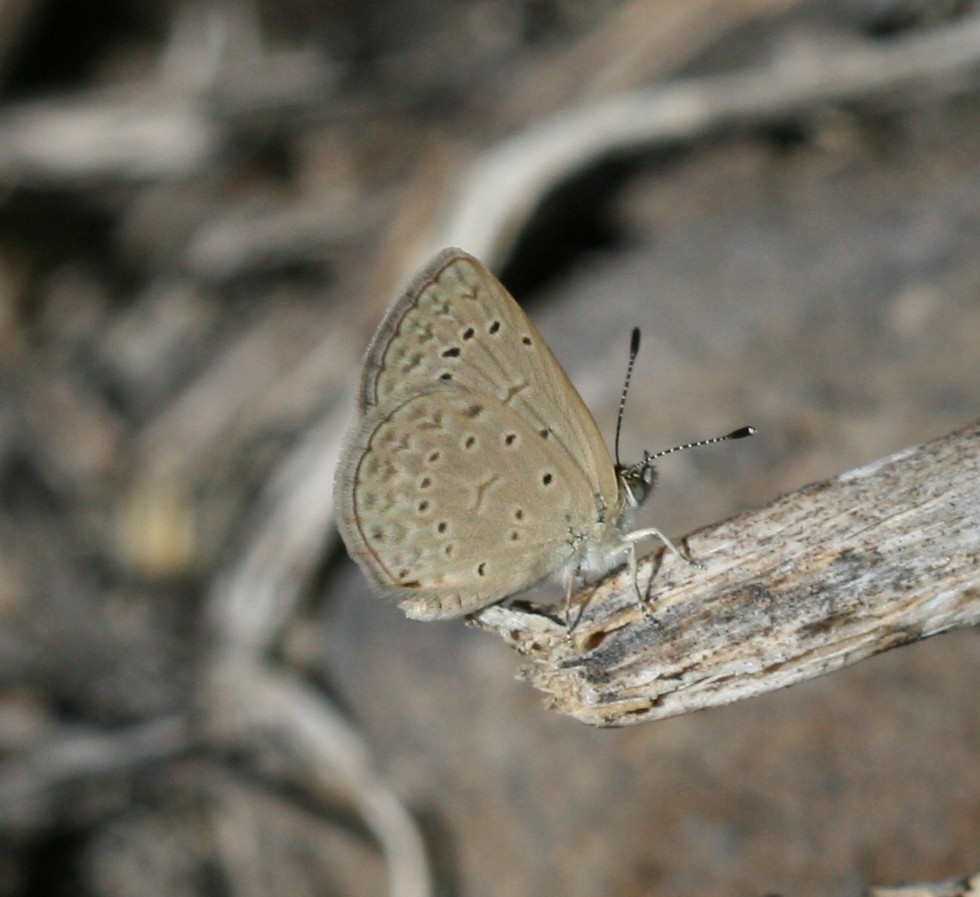

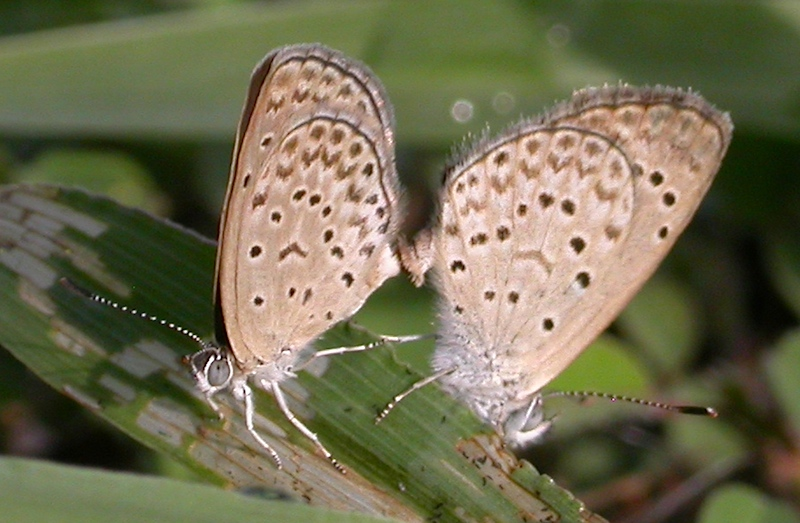

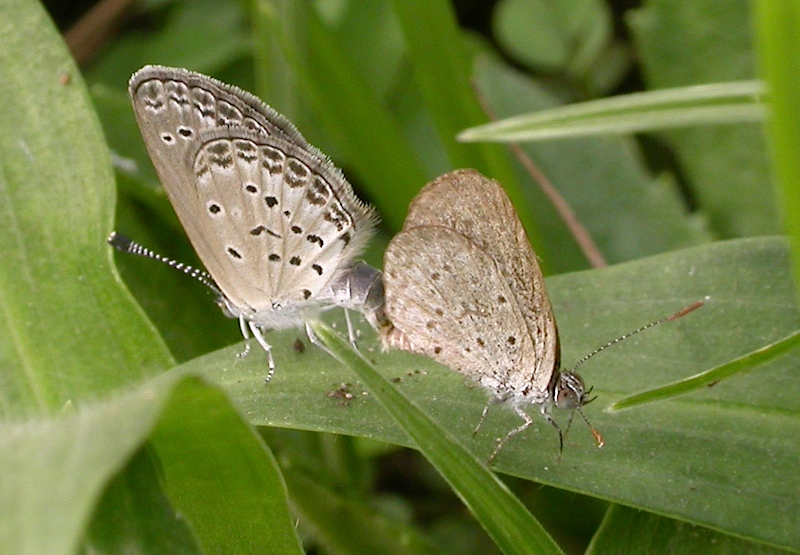

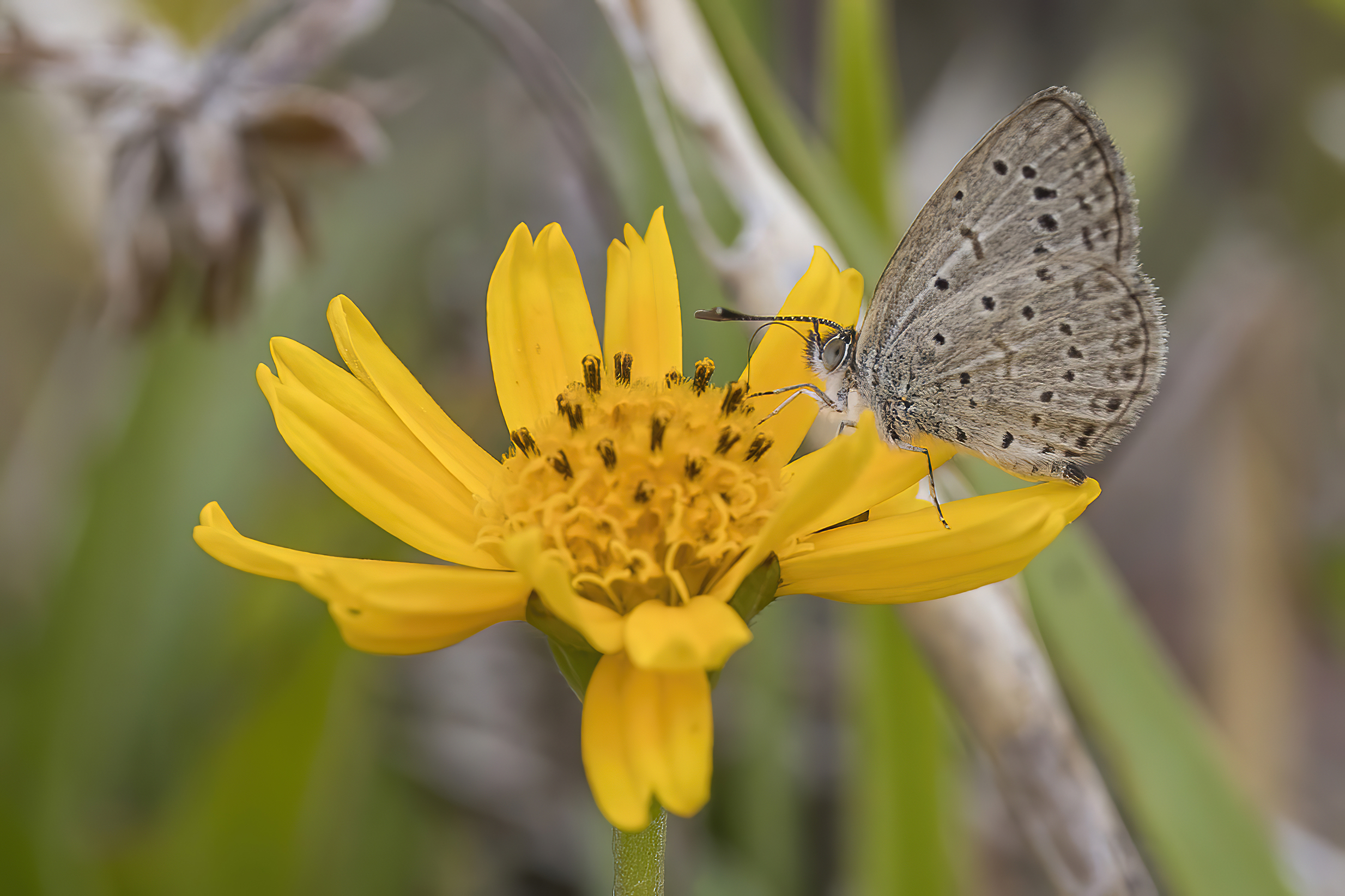

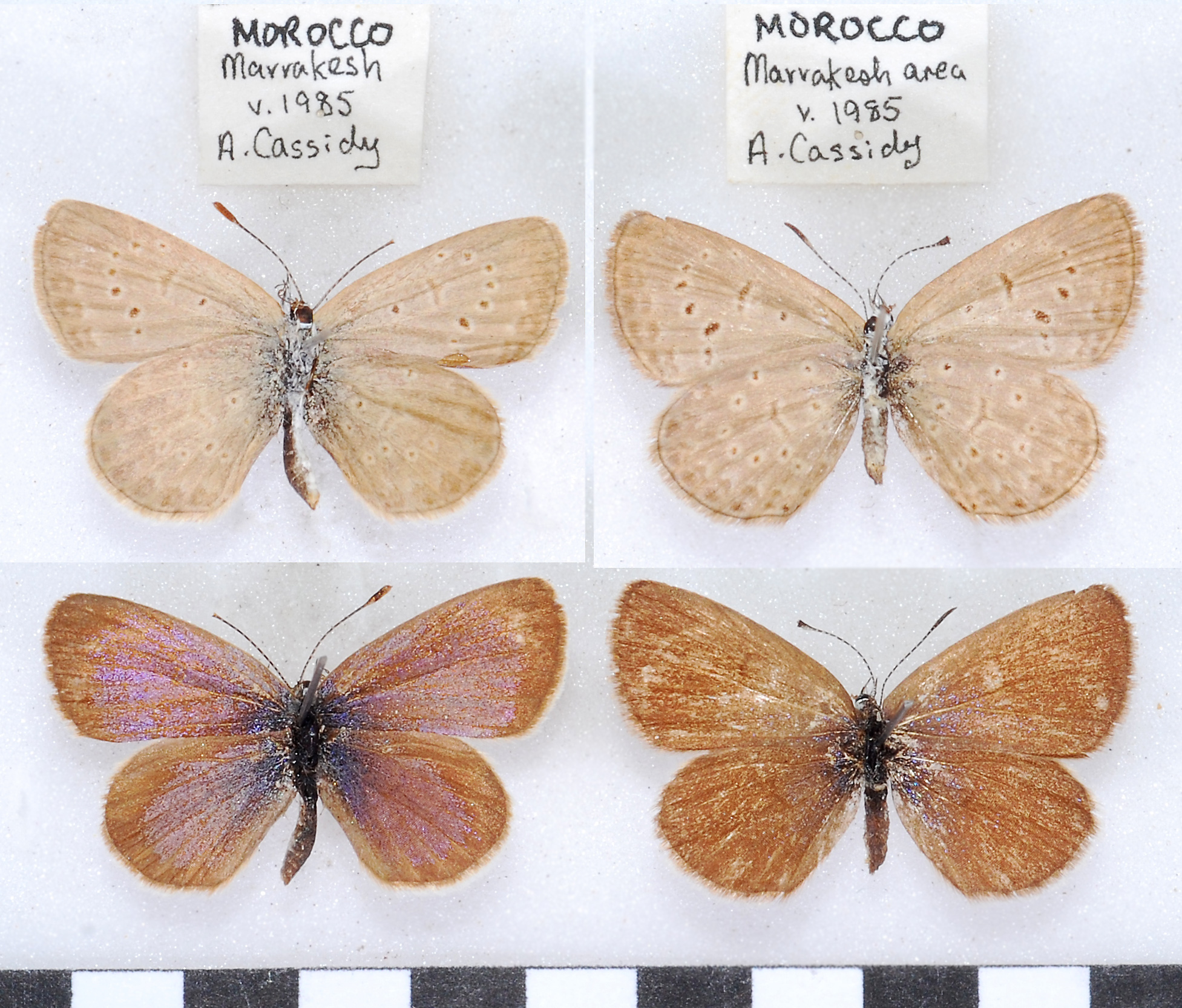

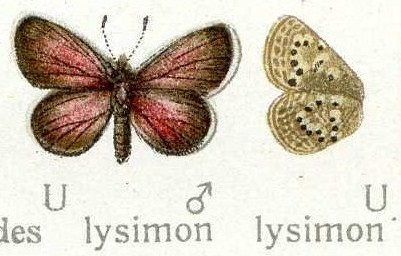
