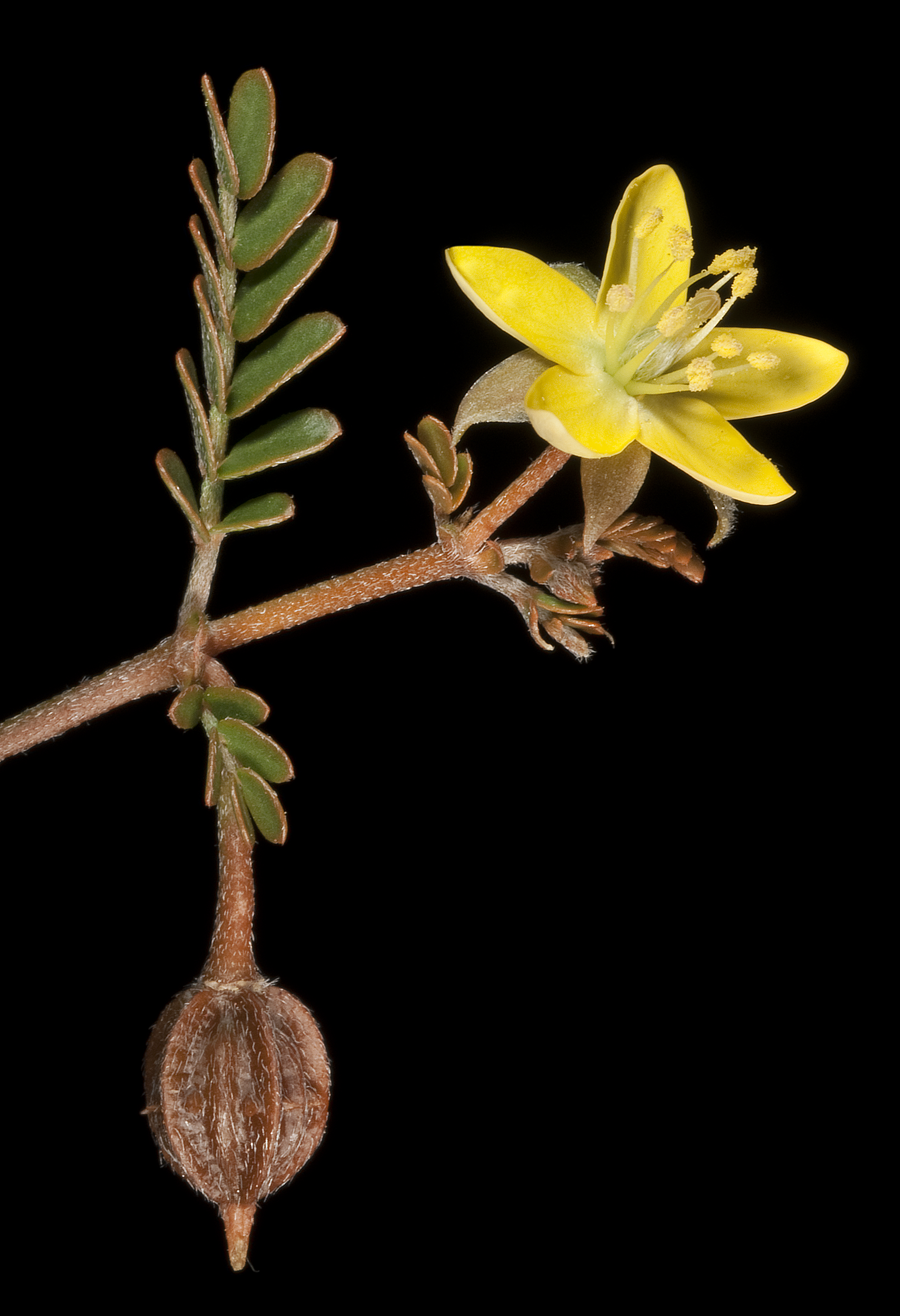

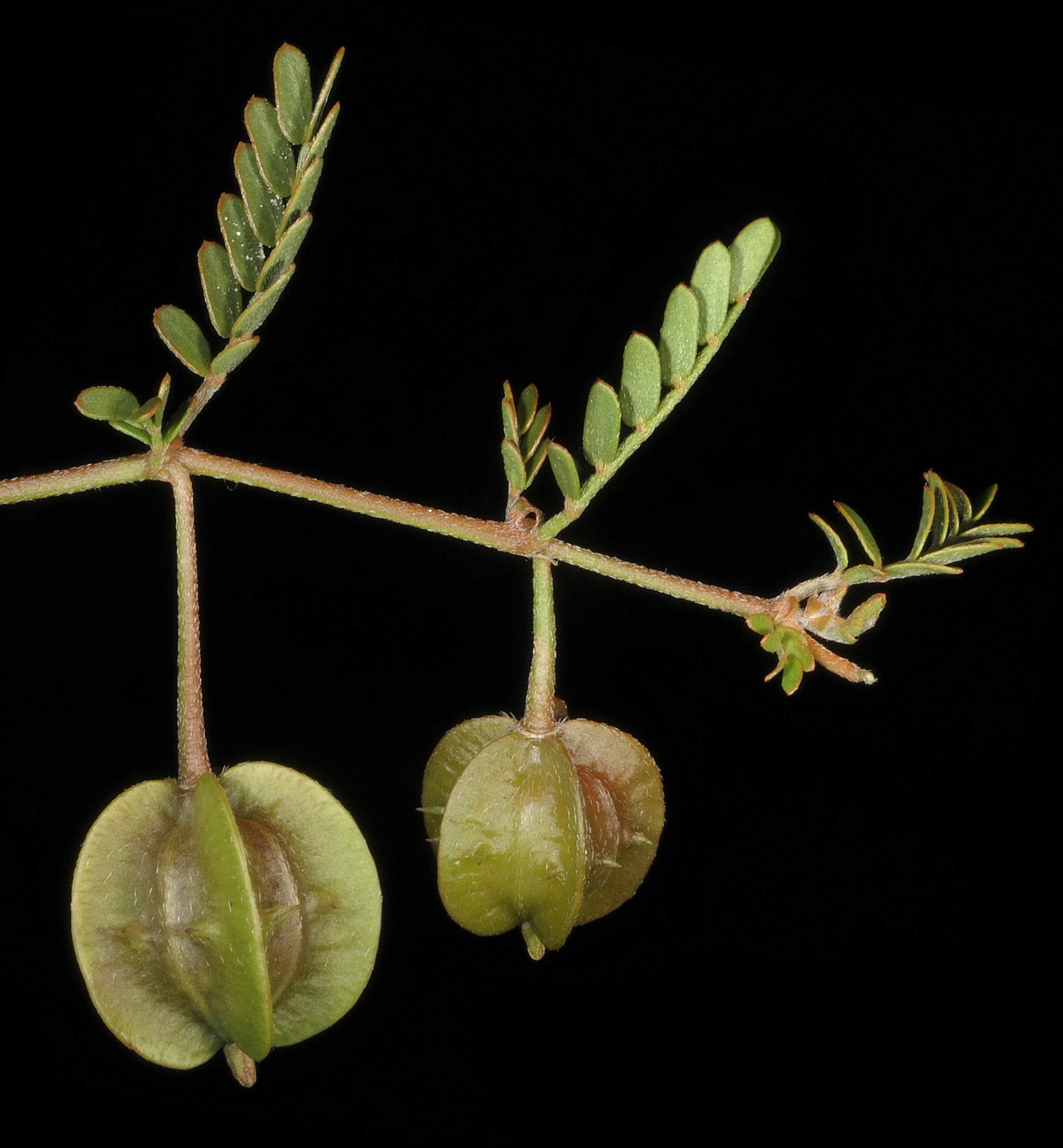

Scientific classification
- Kingdom: Plantae
- Clade: Tracheophytes
- Clade: Angiosperms
- Clade: Eudicots
- Clade: Rosids
- Order: Zygophyllales
- Family: Zygophyllaceae
- Genus: Tribulus
- Species: T. macrocarpus

Binomial name
- Tribulus macrocarpus (Muell.) Benth.

= Tribulus macrocarpus =

Species of flowering plant

Tribulus macrocarpus is a species of flowering plant in the family Zygophyllaceae, which is found to the central north of Western Australia, and southern inland Northern Territory and northern South Australia.

It was first described by George Bentham in 1863 from a specimen collected by Francis Thomas Gregory from Nicol Bay. A holotype (K000725223) collected by Gregory is held at Kew. The specific epithet, macrocarpus, is derived from two Greek roots/words, macro- ("large", "great") and -carpus, ("-fruit" / "-fruited"), and describes the plant as having large fruits.

== Conservation status ==
Under West Australian conservation laws it is deemed to be "not threatened".
