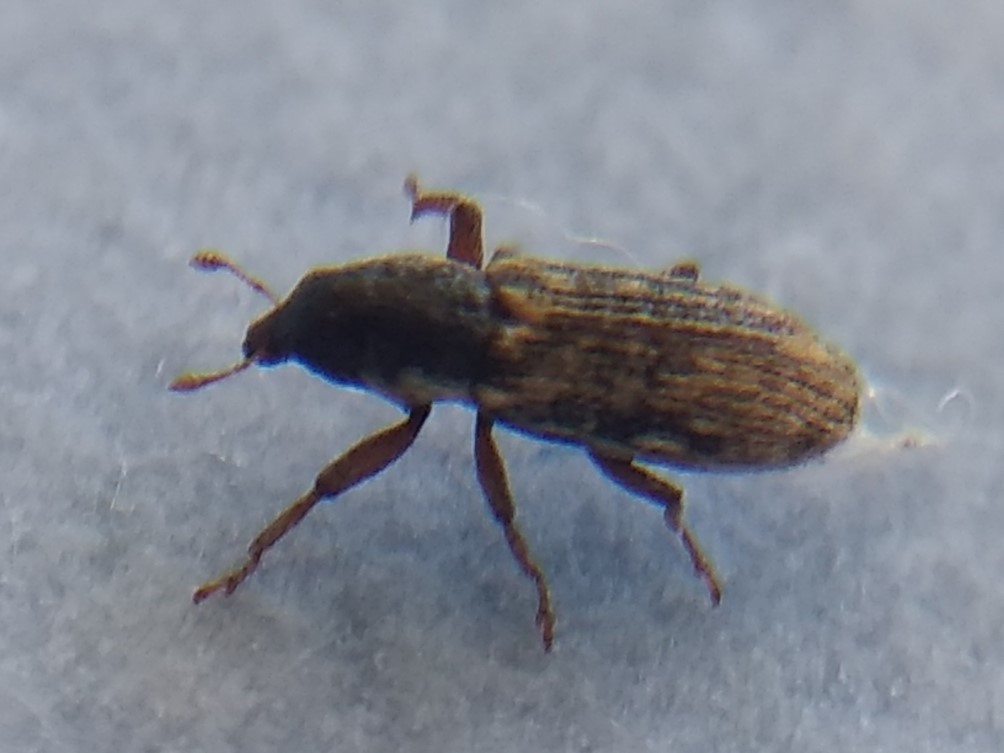

Scientific classification
- Kingdom: Animalia
- Phylum: Arthropoda
- Clade: Pancrustacea
- Class: Insecta
- Order: Coleoptera
- Suborder: Polyphaga
- Infraorder: Cucujiformia
- Family: Curculionidae
- Genus: Microlarinus
- Species: M. lypriformis

Binomial name
- Microlarinus lypriformis (Wollaston, 1861)

= Microlarinus lypriformis =

Species of beetle

Microlarinus lypriformis is a species of weevil in the family Curculionidae. It lays eggs in the stems of the puncturevine, Tribulus terrestris, and the larvae feed on the pith of the plant. After pupation, the adult emerges through holes bored in plant. Along with the seed-feeding Microlarinus lareynii it has been introduced as a biological control agent in the United States of America and Canada against Tribulus terrestris.
