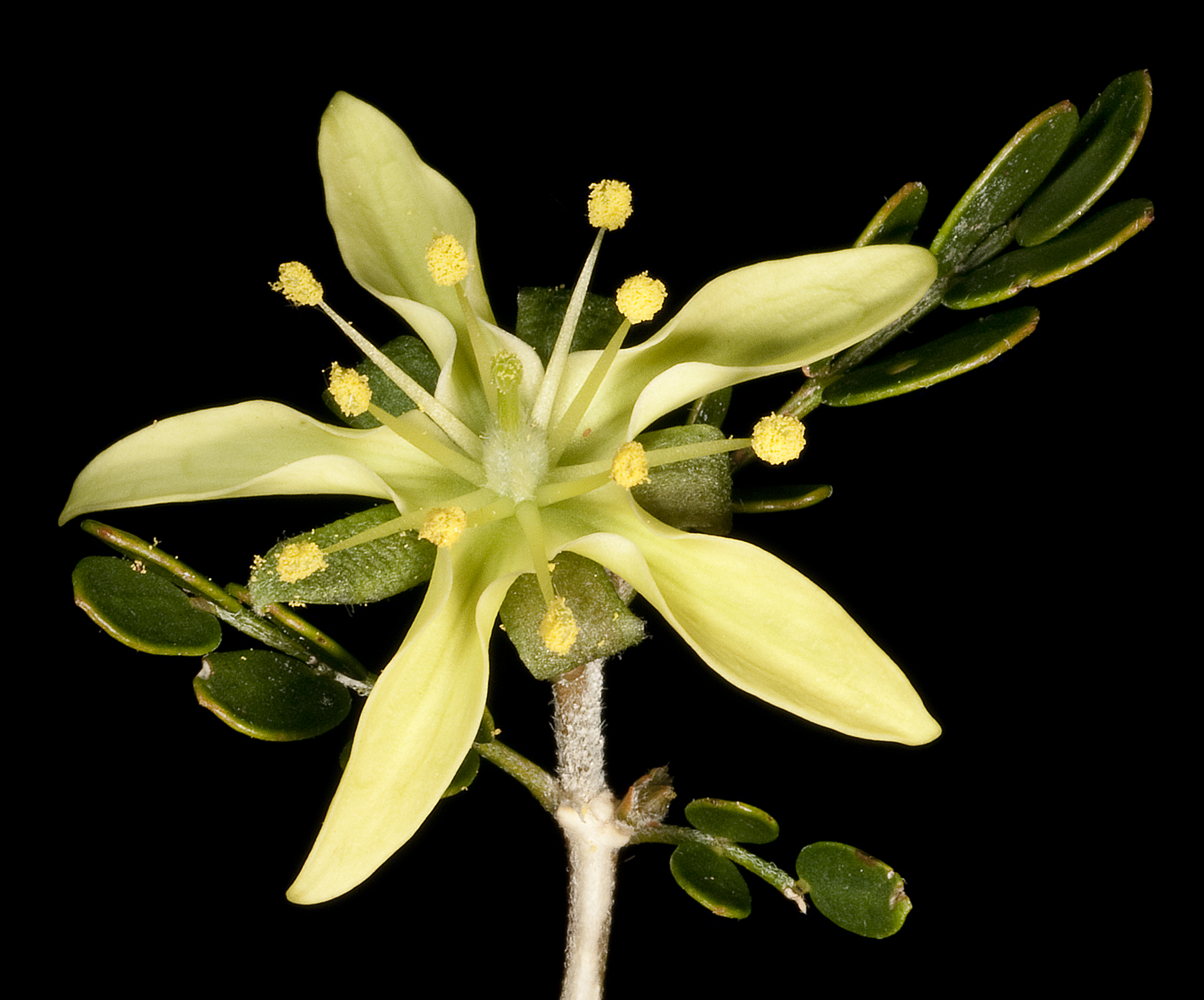

Scientific classification
- Kingdom: Plantae
- Clade: Tracheophytes
- Clade: Angiosperms
- Clade: Eudicots
- Clade: Rosids
- Order: Zygophyllales
- Family: Zygophyllaceae
- Genus: Tribulus
- Species: T. platypterus

Binomial name
- Tribulus platypterus Benth.
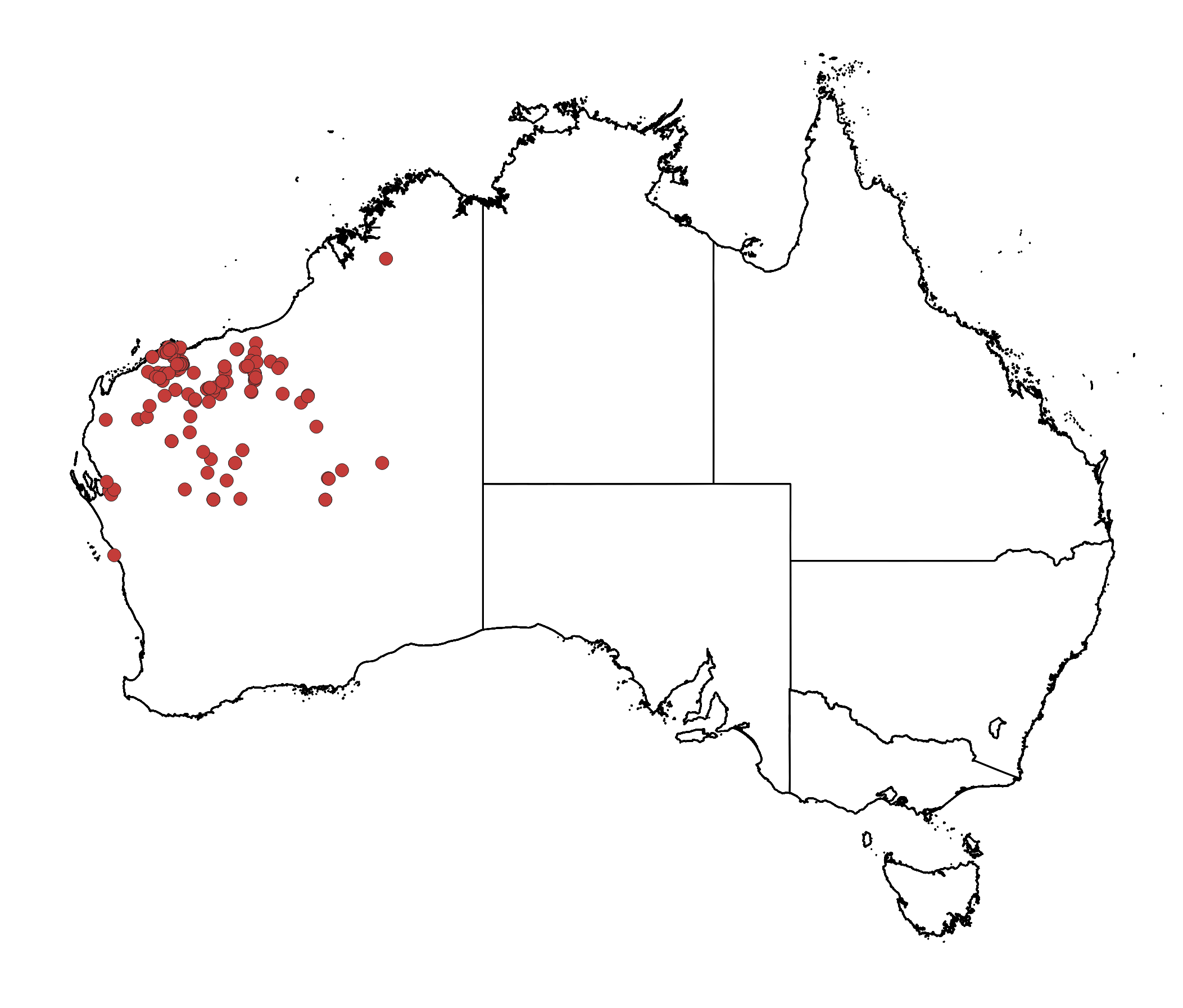
- Occurrence data from AVH

Synonyms
- Kallstroemia platyptera (Benth.) Engl.

= Tribulus platypterus =

Species of flowering plant

Tribulus platypterus, the cork hopbush, is a species of flowering plant in the family Zygophyllaceae, which is endemic to the northwest of Western Australia. It is closely related to Tribulus suberosus.

It was first described by George Bentham in 1863 from a specimen collected by Francis Thomas Gregory in the Hammersley Ranges. An isosyntype (MEL 79454) collected by Gregory (east of the Hammersley Ranges) is held in the National Herbarium of Victoria. The specific epithet, platypterus, is derived from two Greek roots/words, platy- ("broad") and -pterus, ("winged"), and describes the plant as having "broad-winged" fruit.

== Description ==
Tribulus platypterus is a spreading upright shrub which grows to a heights from 40 to 100 cm high and spreading from 50 to 200 cm. The stems usually lack corky bark except at the plant base. The leaves occur in unequal pairs, and have from 4–7 pairs of leaflets on a stalk which is 3–13 mm long. Within each compound leaf the leaflets have short stalks and vary 4–23 mm long by 2.2–8.3 mm wide. The flower stalk is upright and 3.5–6.5 mm long. The sepals are 6–8.5 mm long, and have no covering or have sparse silky hairs on the upper surface, and densely hairy on the lower surface. The petals are elliptic, 10–11 mm long, and not hairy. There are 10 stamens, which may all be fertile or some or all them may be shorter and staminodal. The longer filaments are 5.5–6 mm long; and the shorter filaments are about 3 mm long. The ovary is moderately to densely covered with white silky hairs, and has one ovule per cell. Both the style and stigma are 4.5–6 mm long. The fruit is a ball-shaped 5-winged schizocarp (a fruit which splits into individual carpels), the wings of which give rise to the specific epithet of "broad winged", and is 12–18 mm long by 15–21 mm wide.

It mostly flowers from August to October.

== Distribution & habitat ==
It is found in the IBRA Regions of the Central Kimberley, the Gascoyne, the Little Sandy Desert, the Murchison, and the Pilbara, in rocky areas, including creek banks and beds, and often in sand.

== Conservation status ==
Under West Australian conservation laws it is deemed to be "not threatened".
