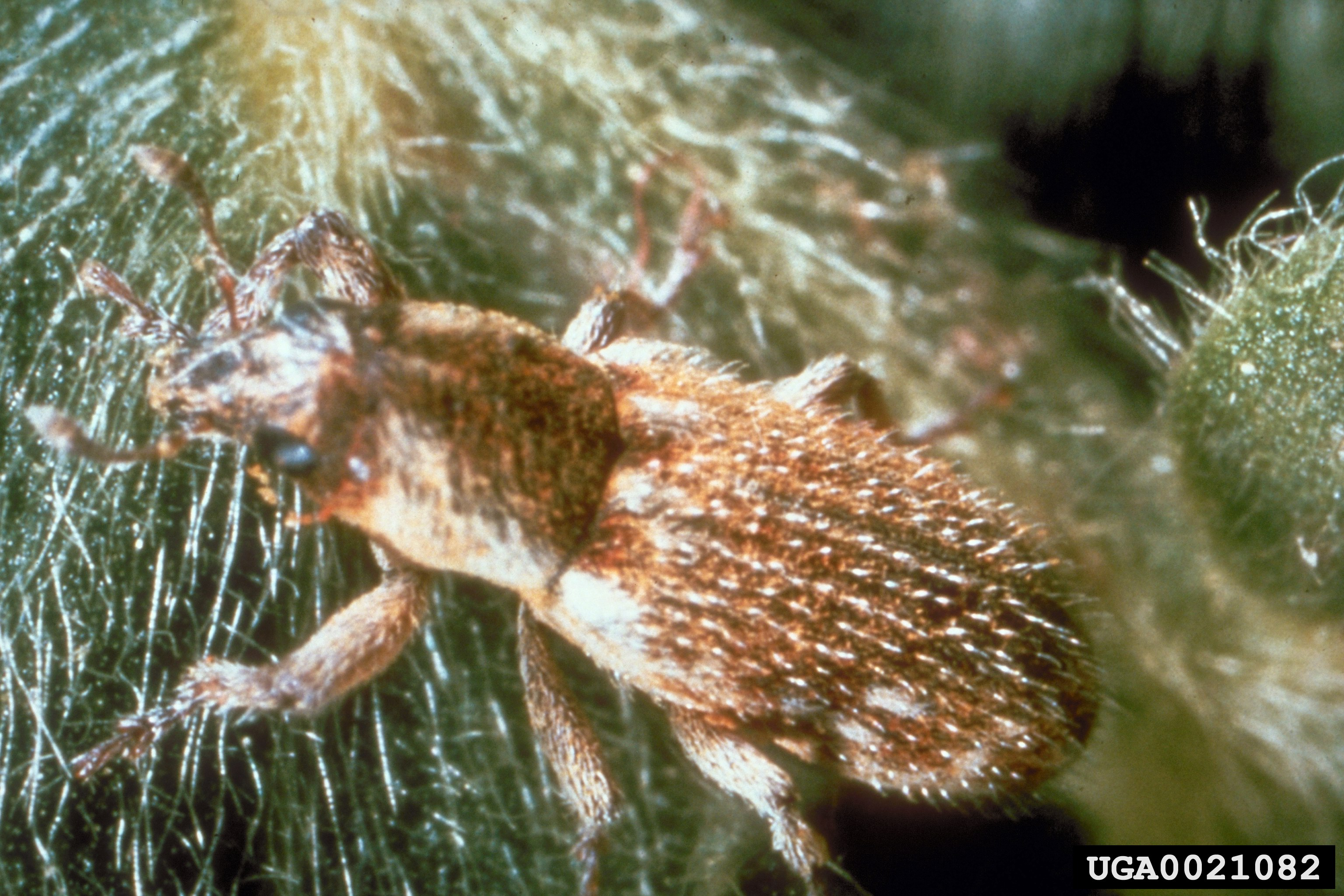

Scientific classification
- Kingdom: Animalia
- Phylum: Arthropoda
- Clade: Pancrustacea
- Class: Insecta
- Order: Coleoptera
- Suborder: Polyphaga
- Infraorder: Cucujiformia
- Superfamily: Curculionoidea
- Family: Curculionidae
- Genus: Microlarinus
- Species: M. lareynii

Binomial name
- Microlarinus lareynii (Jacquelin du Val, 1852)

= Microlarinus lareynii =

Species of beetle

Microlarinus lareynii, commonly known as puncturevine seed weevil, is a weevil of the family Curculionidae. It is native to interior regions of Italy, France and Rajasthan in India.

Microlarinus lareynii feeds on the seeds of the puncturevine, Tribulus terrestris. Together with Microlarinus lypriformis, which feeds on the stems of the puncturevine, it has been introduced as a biological control agent in the United States of America and Canada.
