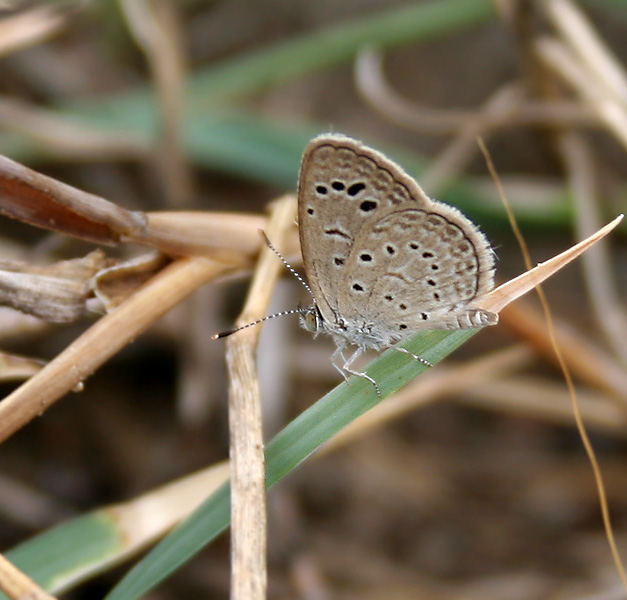
- Dark grass blue (Zizeeria karsandra) in Hyderabad, India

Scientific classification
- Kingdom: Animalia
- Phylum: Arthropoda
- Class: Insecta
- Order: Lepidoptera
- Family: Lycaenidae
- Subfamily: Polyommatinae
- Tribe: Polyommatini
- Genus: Zizeeria; Chapman, 1910

Species
- Two, see text

= Zizeeria =

Butterfly genus in family Lycaenidae

Zizeeria, commonly called grass blues, is a genus of butterflies in the family Lycaenidae, found in Africa and Asia.

== Species ==
List of species classified under the genus:

- Zizeeria karsandra (Moore, 1865) – dark grass blue
- Zizeeria knysna (Trimen, 1862) – African grass blue, sooty blue

=== Notes ===
The following were previously included here due to online database listings but can be placed elsewhere:

- Zizeeria antanossa (Mabille, 1877). A species or subspecies later in Zizina Chapman, 1910.
- Zizeeria otis (Fabricius, 1787). A species in Zizina Chapman, 1910.
- Zizeeria labradus (Godart, 1823). A species or subspecies later in Zizina Chapman, 1910.
- Zizeeria ossa (Swinhoe, 1885). A subspecies of Pseudozizeeria maha (Kollar, [1844]).
