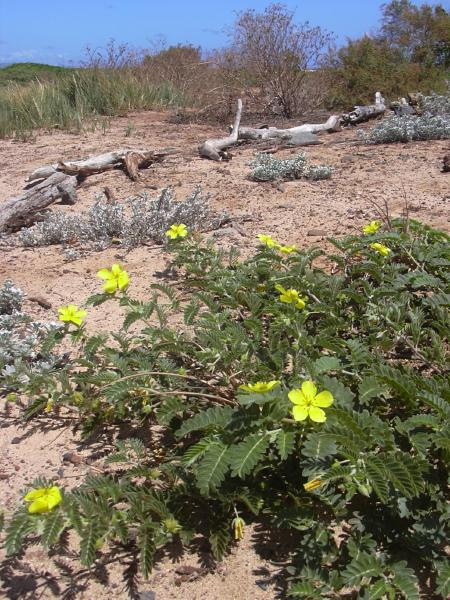
- Tribulus cistoides in flower

Scientific classification
- Kingdom: Plantae
- Clade: Tracheophytes
- Clade: Angiosperms
- Clade: Eudicots
- Clade: Rosids
- Order: Zygophyllales
- Family: Zygophyllaceae
- Genus: Tribulus
- Species: T. cistoides

Binomial name
- Tribulus cistoides L.

Synonyms
- Kallstroemia cistoides (L.) Endl. Tribulus alacranensis Millsp. Tribulus moluccanus Decne. Tribulus sericeus Andersson; Tribulus terrestris var. cistoides (L.) Oliv.

= Tribulus cistoides =

Species of flowering plant

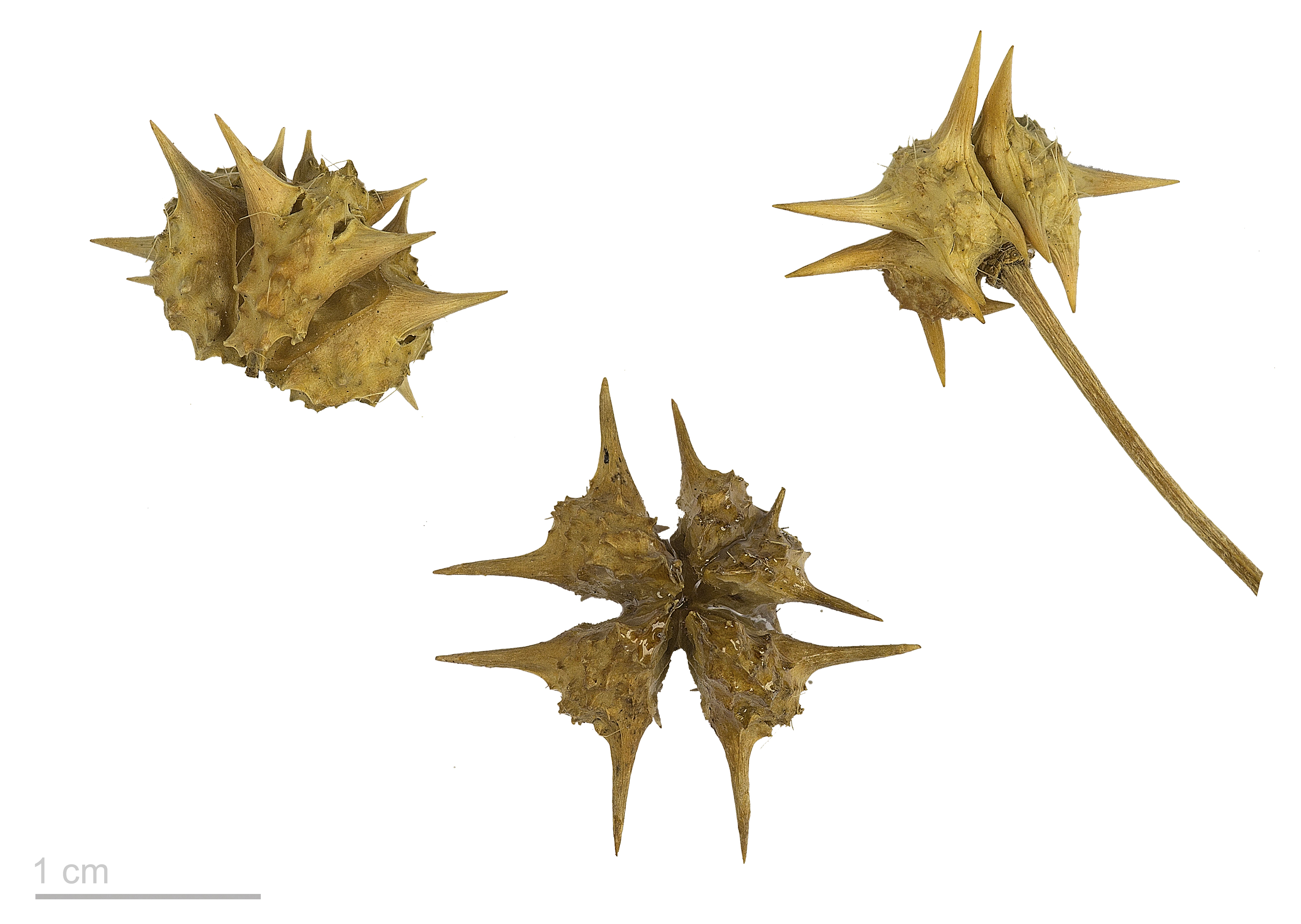
Tribulus cistoides - MHNT

Tribulus cistoides, also called wanglo (in Aruba), the Jamaican feverplant or puncture vine, is a species of flowering plant in the family Zygophyllaceae, which is widely distributed in tropical and subtropical regions.

== Habitat ==
Tribulus cistoides, known locally in Mexico as “Abrojo de tierra caliente” (thistle of the hot country), grows in Central, South, and the southern part of North America. It survives well in arid low land close to the shore and where sand or loose soil is present. This is also why it may survive in urban environments in or by the gutters of roads, as there may be loose soil nearby.
