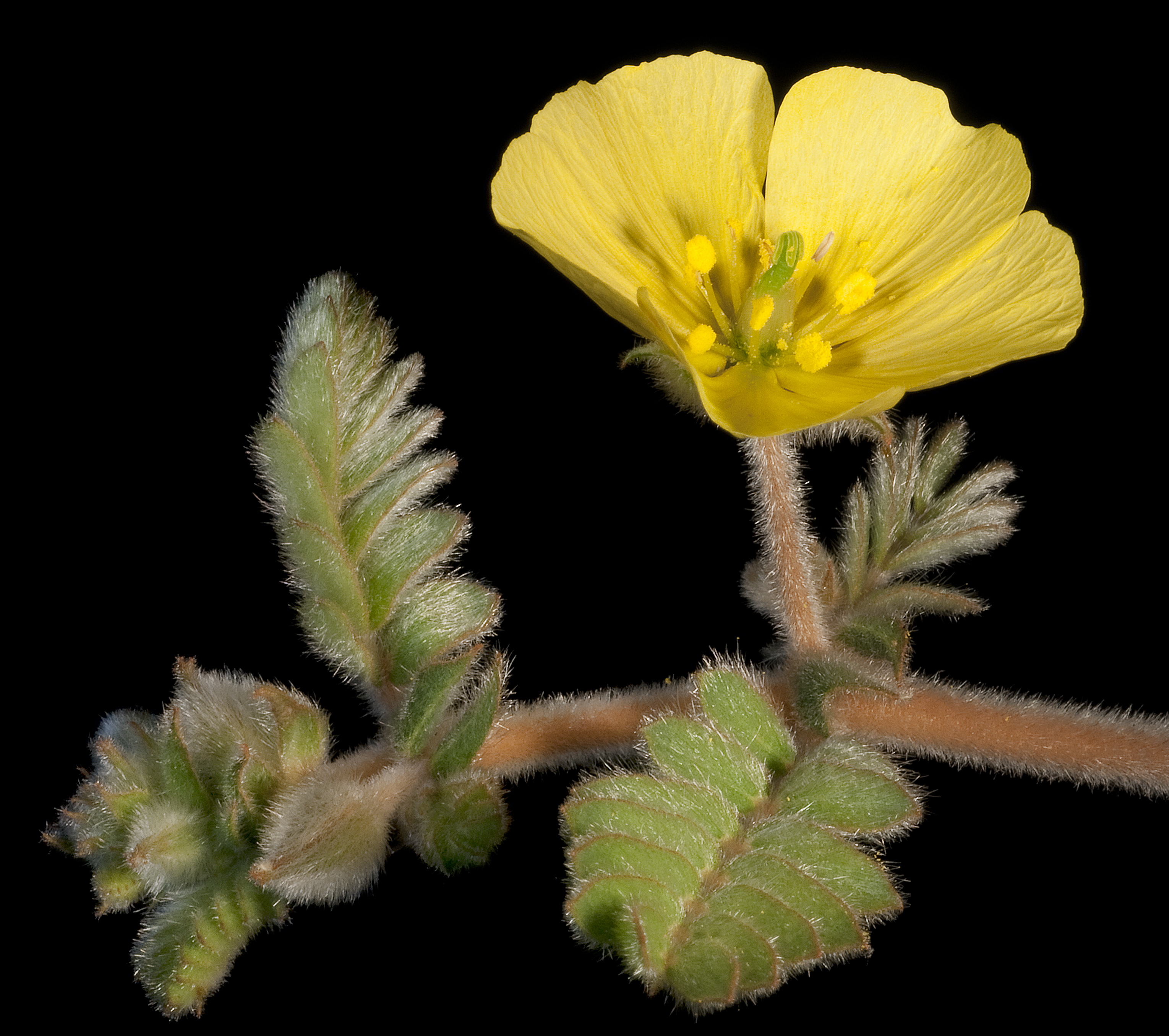

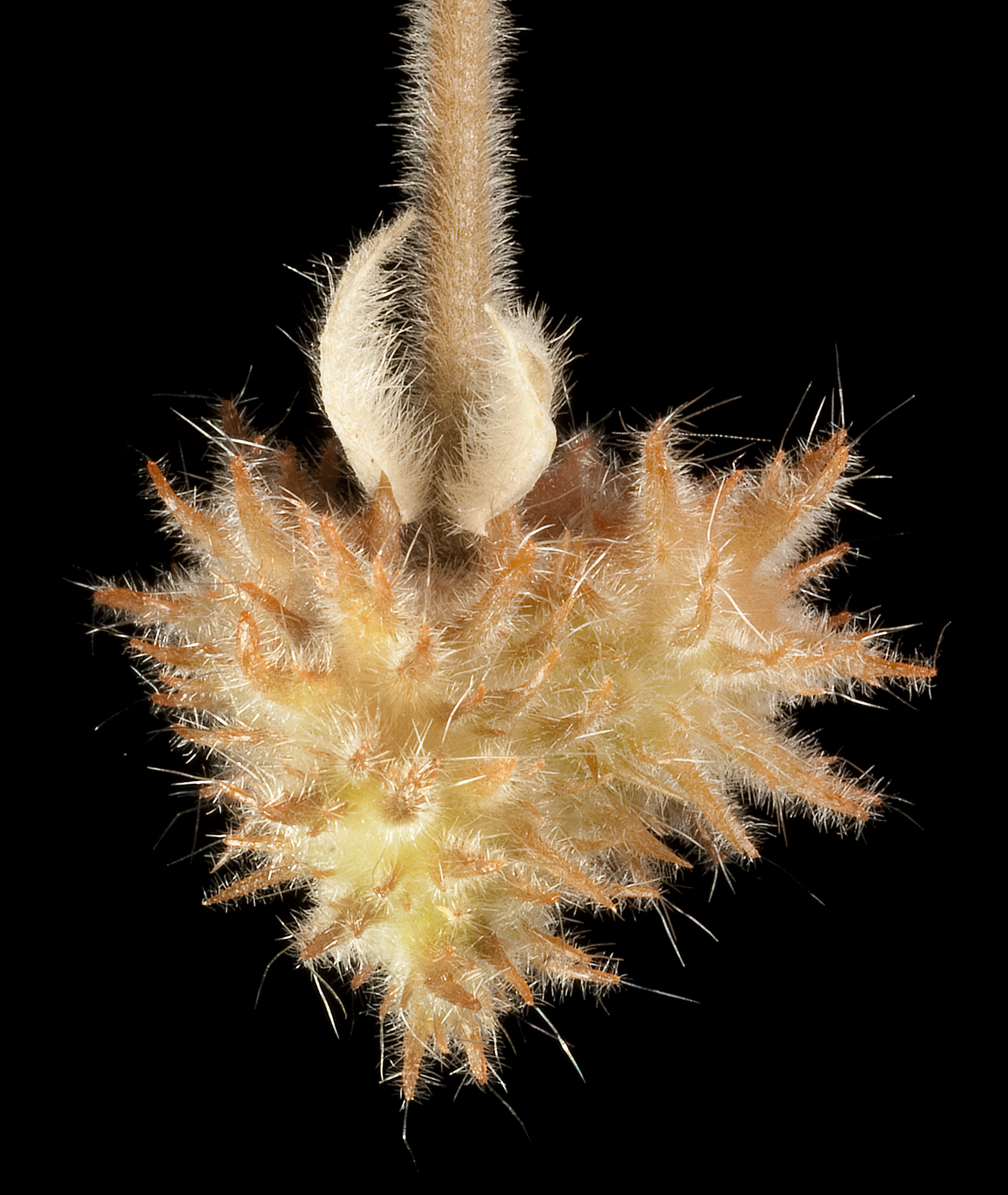
- Fruit

Scientific classification
- Kingdom: Plantae
- Clade: Tracheophytes
- Clade: Angiosperms
- Clade: Eudicots
- Clade: Rosids
- Order: Zygophyllales
- Family: Zygophyllaceae
- Genus: Tribulus
- Species: T. occidentalis

Binomial name
- Tribulus occidentalis R.Br.

= Tribulus occidentalis =

Species of flowering plant

Tribulus occidentalis, common name perennial caltrop, is a species of flowering plant in the family Zygophyllaceae, which is native to Australia, and found in Western Australia, Queensland, South Australia and the Northern Territory. However, Robyn Barker asserts that it is confined to the west coast of Western Australia.

It is a prostrate perennial herb, covered in long shaggy hairs and growing from 2 cm to 10 cm high. The leaves occur in pairs, and have leaflets in 7 - 10 pairs. The fruits have many spines, which are from 4 to 8 mm long. It grows on sandy soils and its yellow flowers can be seen from February to November.

It was first described in 1849 by Robert Brown, from a specimen collected on the "west coast of Australia, or on some of its islands, in the Voyage of the Beagle." There are no synonyms.
