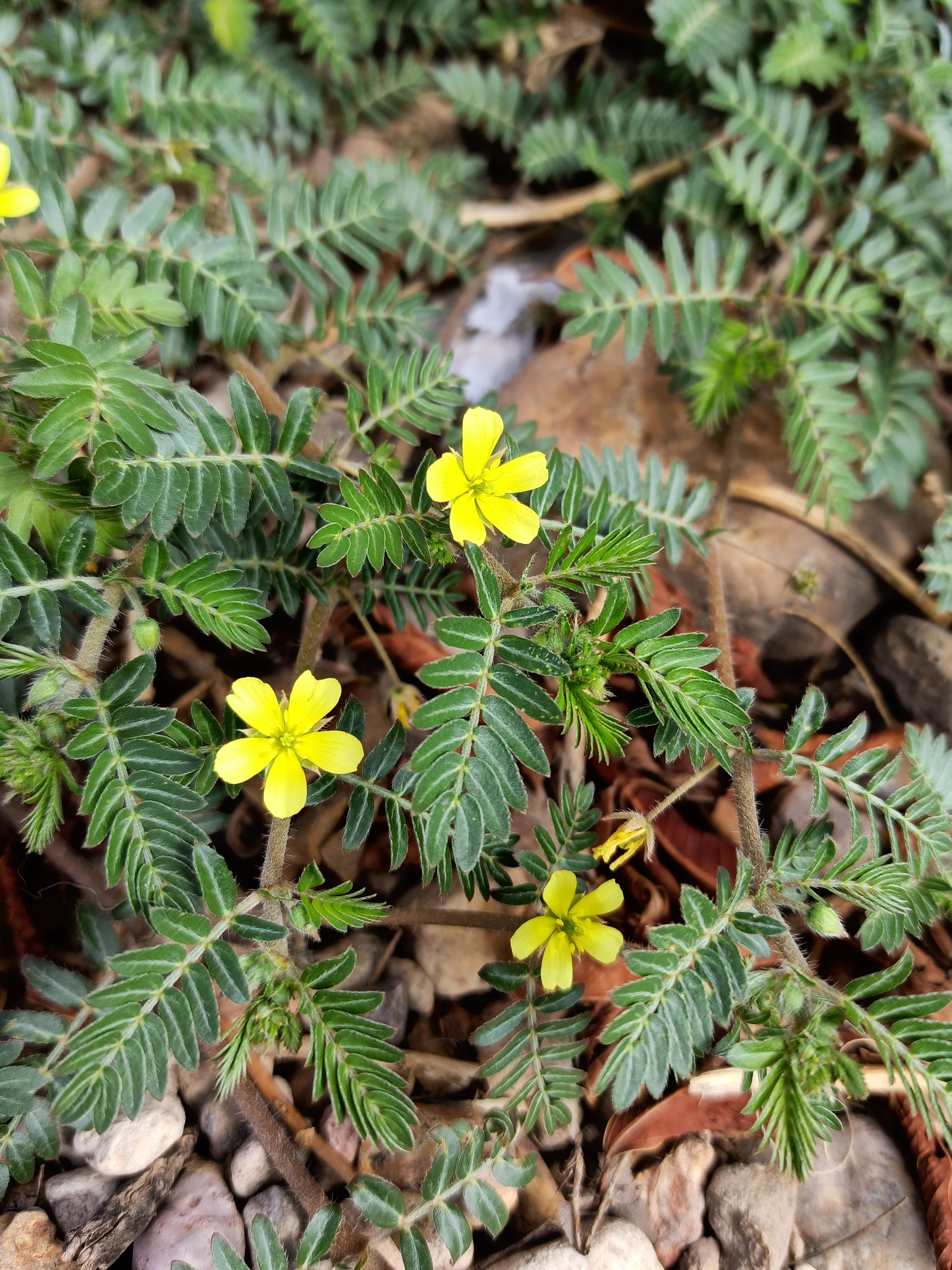
- Leaves and flower

Conservation status
- Least Concern (IUCN 3.1)

Scientific classification
- Kingdom: Plantae
- Clade: Embryophytes
- Clade: Tracheophytes
- Clade: Angiosperms
- Clade: Eudicots
- Clade: Rosids
- Order: Zygophyllales
- Family: Zygophyllaceae
- Genus: Tribulus
- Species: T. terrestris

Binomial name
- Tribulus terrestris L.

Varieties
- Tribulus terrestris var. bicornutus; Tribulus terrestris var. inermis; Tribulus terrestris var. robustus; Tribulus terrestris var. terrestris

= Tribulus terrestris =

Species of flowering plant

Tribulus terrestris is an annual plant in the caltrop family (Zygophyllaceae) widely distributed around the world. It is adapted to thrive in dry climate locations in which few other plants can survive, and is a highly invasive species.

Native to warm temperate and tropical regions in southern Eurasia and Africa, it has been unintentionally introduced to North America and Australia. T. terrestris is widely known as a noxious weed because of its small woody fruit – the bur – having long sharp and strong spines which easily penetrate surfaces, such as bare feet or thin shoes of crop workers and other pedestrians, the rubber of bicycle tires, and the mouths and skin of grazing animals.

== Common names ==
Like many weedy species, this plant has numerous common names according to the world region, including puncture vine, goathead, bullhead, calthrop, devil's thorn, sandbur, and burnut.

== Description ==
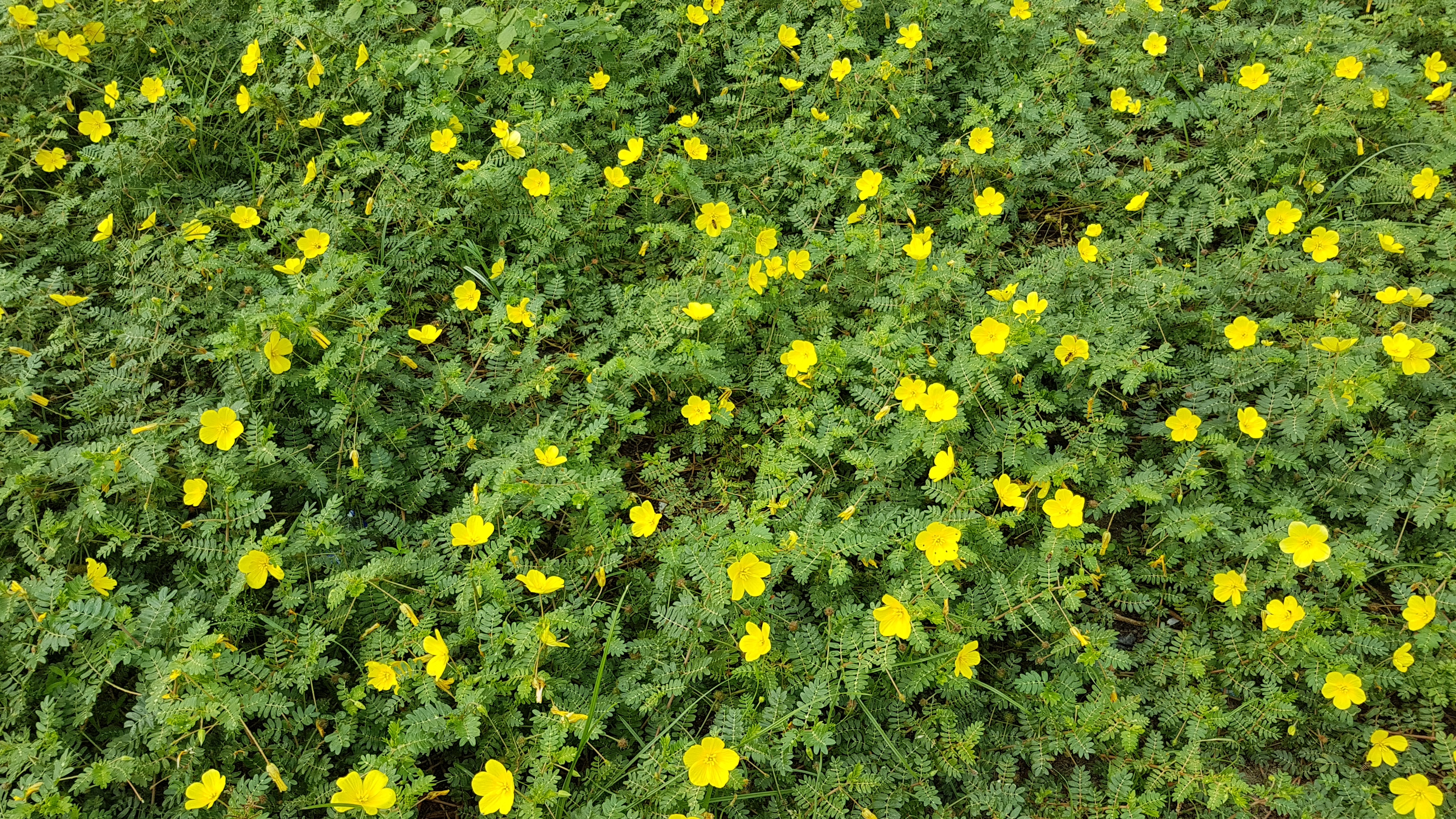
Tribulus terrestris habitus on a beach in the Philippines

Tribulus terrestris is a taprooted herbaceous plant that grows as a summer annual in temperate climates.

=== Growth pattern ===
The stems radiate from the crown to a diameter of about 10 cm (4 in) to over 1 m (3 ft 3 in), often branching. They are usually prostrate, forming flat patches, though they may grow more upwards in shade or among taller plants.

=== Leaves and stem ===
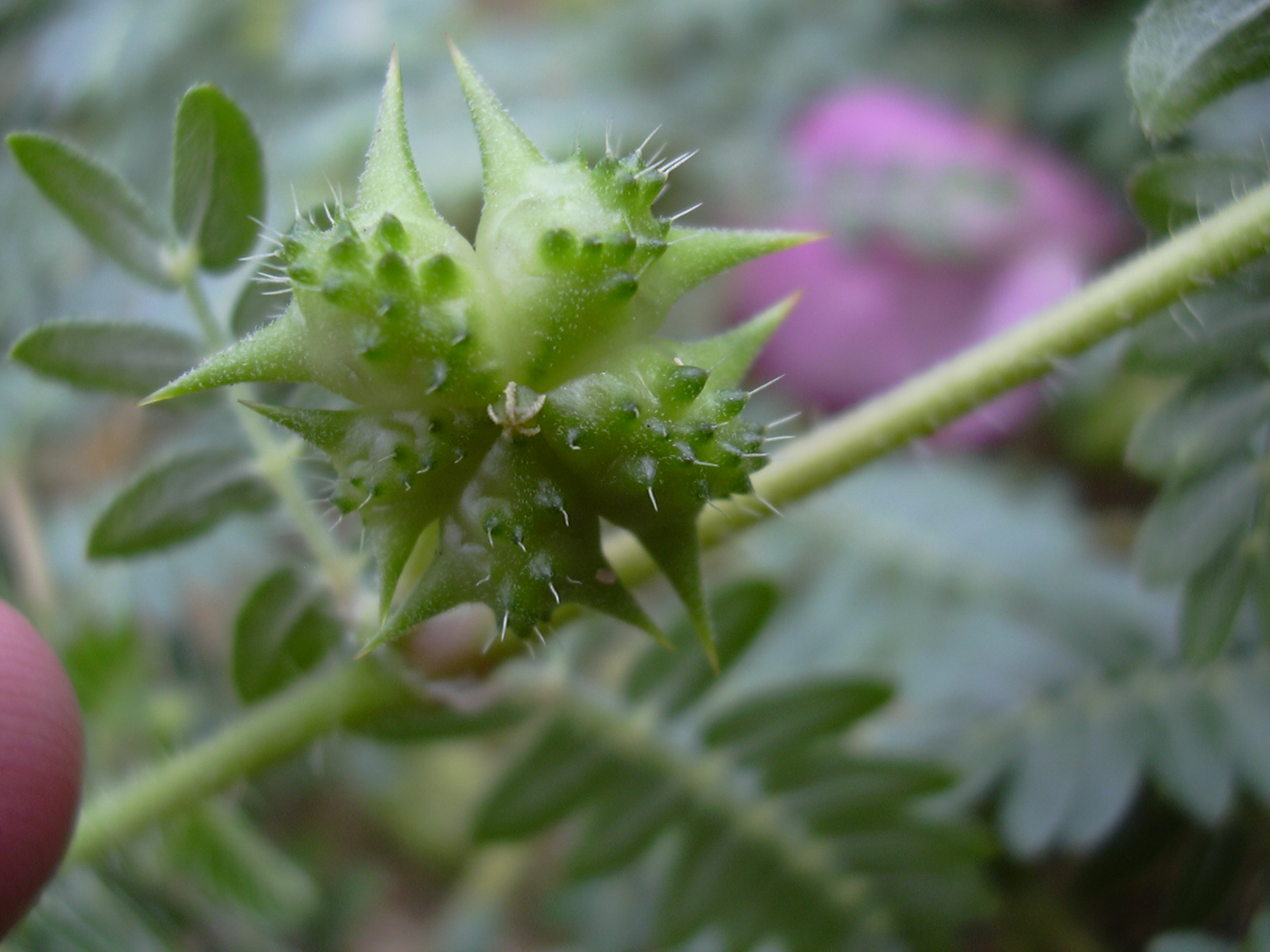
"Goathead" fruit

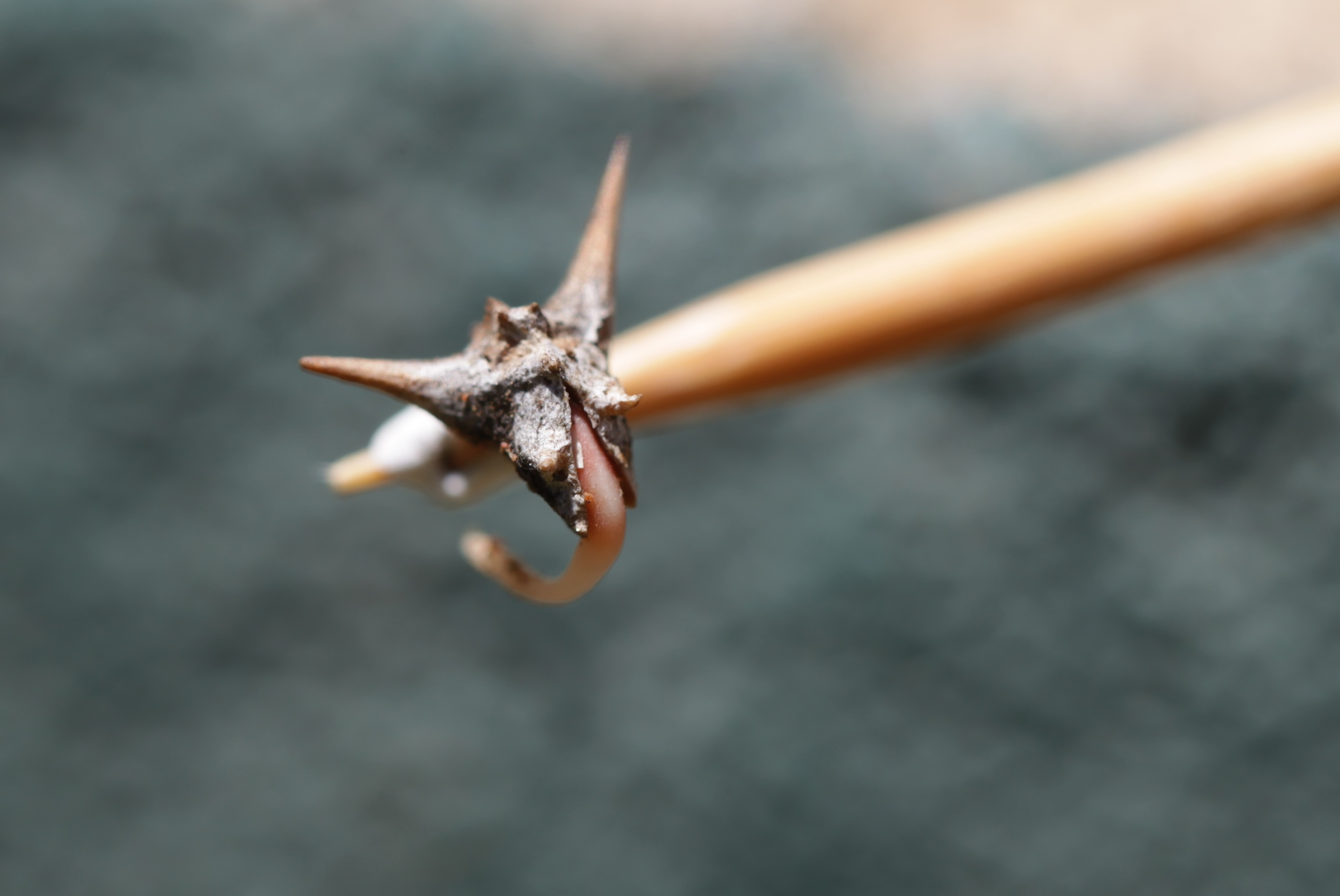
Germinating fruit of Tribulus terrestris

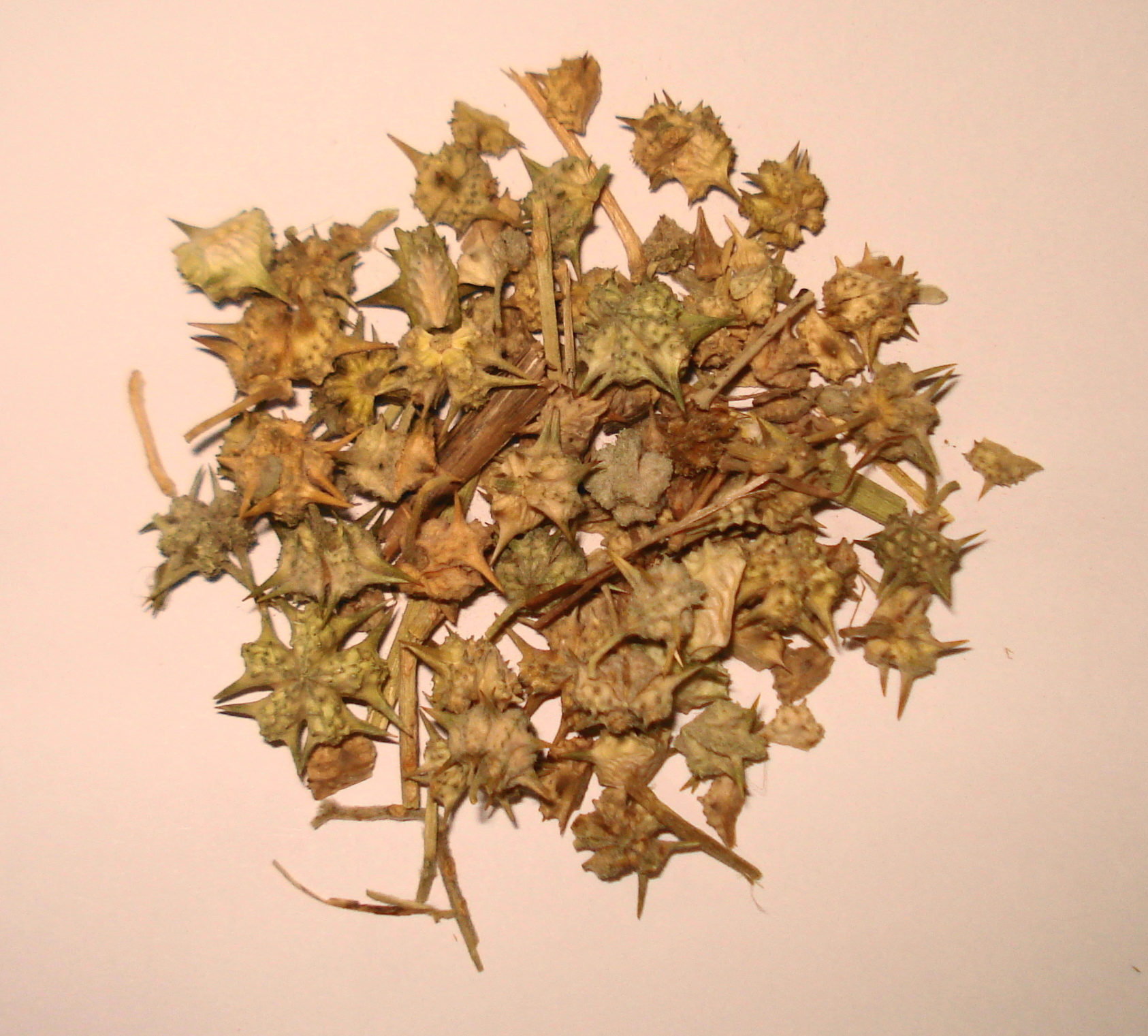
Dried Tribulus terrestris burs

Stems branch from the crown and are densely hairy. Leaves are opposite and pinnately compound. Densely hairy leaflets are opposite and up to 3 mm (1/8 in) long.

=== Inflorescence ===
The flowers are 4–10 mm (3/16–3/8 in) wide, with five lemon-yellow petals, five sepals, and ten stamens. In Southern California, it blooms from April through October, where it is highly invasive in waste places and disturbed sites.

=== Fruit ===
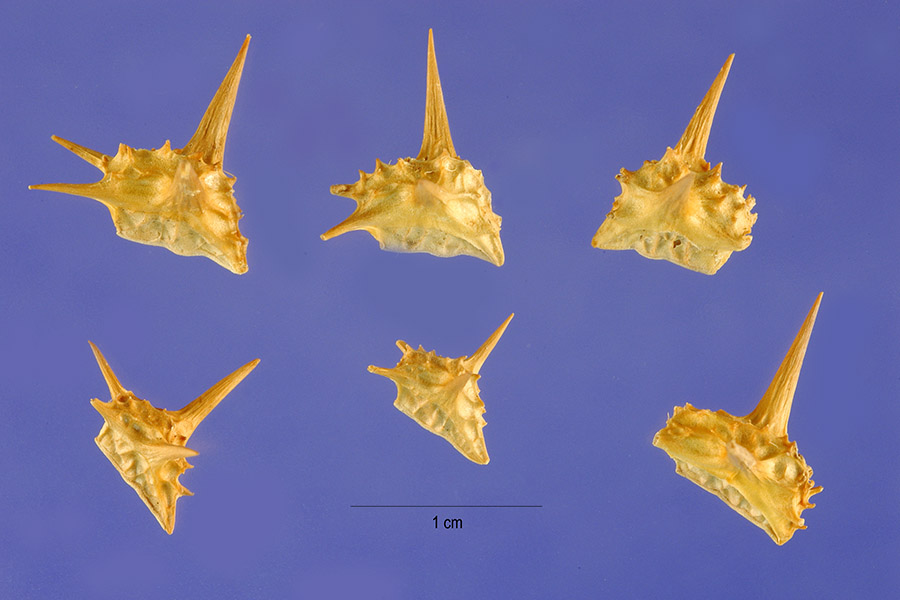
Thumbtack-like Tribulus terrestris burs are a hazard to bare feet and bicycle tires.

After the flower blooms, a fruit develops that easily falls apart into five burs. The burs are hard and bear two to four sharp spines, 10 mm (3/8 in) long and 4–6 mm (3/16–1/4 in) broad point-to-point. These burs strikingly resemble goats' or bulls' heads, characteristics which give the bur its common names in some regions. The "horns" are sharp enough to puncture bicycle tires and other air-filled tires. They can also cause painful injury to bare feet and can injure the mouths of livestock grazing on the plant.

Within each bur, seeds are stacked on top of each other, separated by a hard membrane. As an adaptation to dry climates, the largest seed germinates first, while the others may wait until more moisture is available before germinating. The bur spines point upward, where they stick into feet and fur of animals, serving the purpose of seed dispersal. This causes damage to domesticated livestock and degrades wool.

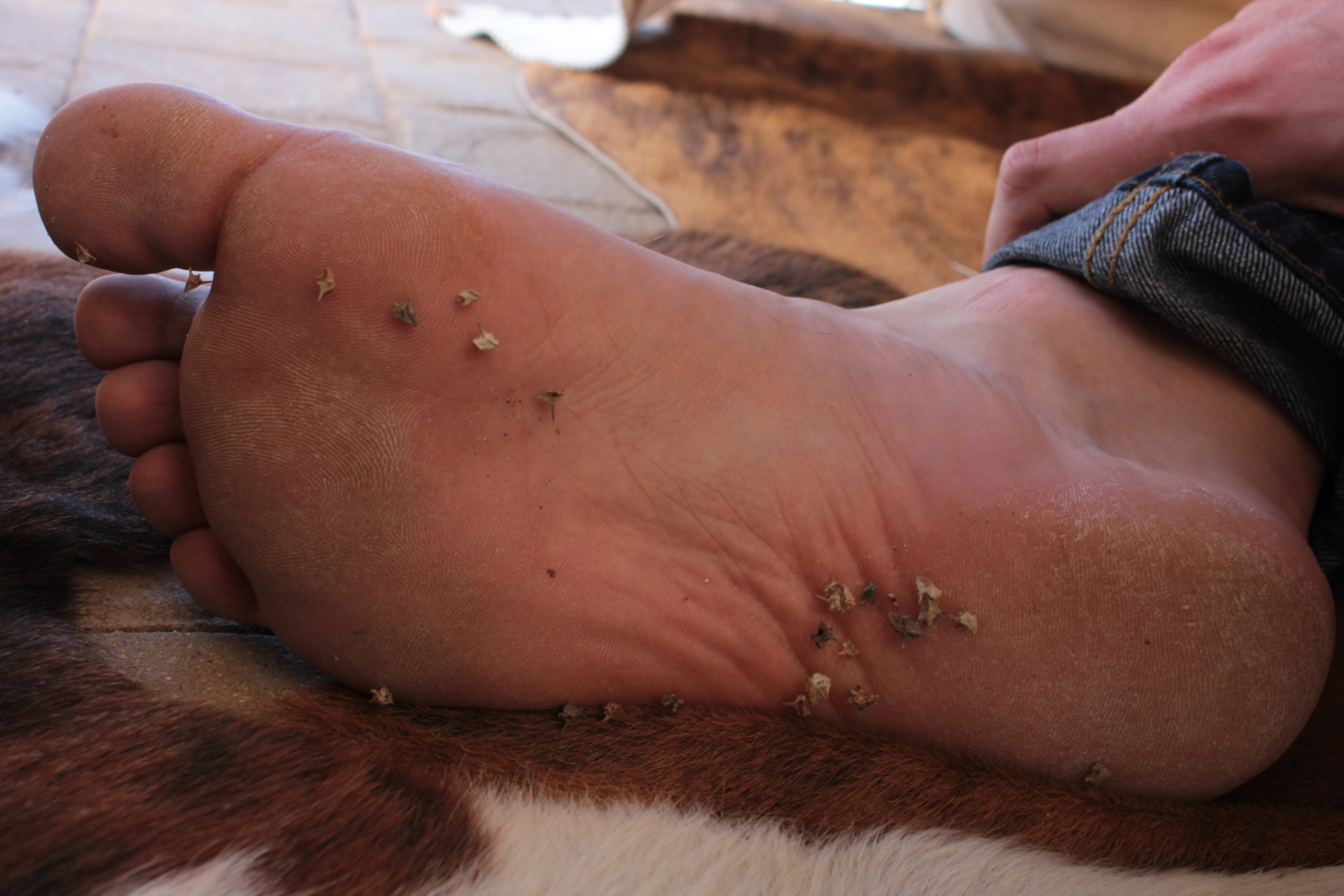
Tribulus terrestris burs in foot, Marfa, Texas

== Range and habitat ==
T. terrestris is currently widespread throughout the world from latitudes 35°S to 47°N. It is distributed across warm temperate and tropical regions of southern Europe, southern Asia, throughout Africa, New Zealand, and Australia. It is also present across southern North America and in Central and South America. Over the 20th century, it appeared in California and became distributed northward, eventually appearing in British Columbia, Canada where it is classified as a noxious weed.

A network of fine rootlets arising from the taproot allow the plant to survive in arid conditions. It grows in almost any soil, but thrives in dry, loose, sandy soils, and even in sand or in deserts. It can prosper in heavier soils, especially if fertile or moist, and on compacted soils along roadsides.

== Etymology ==
The Greek word, τρίβολος meaning 'water-chestnut', translated into Latin as tribulos. The Latin name tribulus originally meant the caltrop (a spiky weapon of similar shape), but in Classical times the word already meant this plant as well.

== Cultivation ==
The plant is widely naturalized in the Americas and also in Australia south of its native range. In some states in the United States, it is considered a noxious weed and an invasive species. It is a "declared plant" in South Australia: its transportation and sale are prohibited, and landowners may be required to control it.

== Uses ==
The leaves and shoots are eaten in East Asia. The stems have been used as a thickener, added to diluted buttermilk to give it the appearance of undiluted buttermilk.

=== Dietary supplement ===
Although its extract has been used as a dietary supplement since the 1980s in belief that it increases testosterone levels to aid body building or sexual enhancement in men, T. terrestris did not consistently affect testosterone levels in controlled studies and has not been proven to be safe. High-quality research on T. terrestris extract has not been conducted, and no reviews indicate that it has strength-enhancing properties or anabolic steroid effects as a bodybuilding supplement or sexual enhancement. The Australian Institute of Sport discourages athletes from using T. terrestris supplements, stating that there is no good evidence for their effectiveness or safety.

A 2024 evidence map identified two low-quality clinical studies of oral T. terrestris tested for sexual symptoms of genitourinary syndrome of menopause in postmenopausal women, finding that the literature was too heterogeneous to draw conclusions.

=== Phytochemistry ===
Phytochemicals of T. terrestris include steroidal saponins.

== Eradication ==
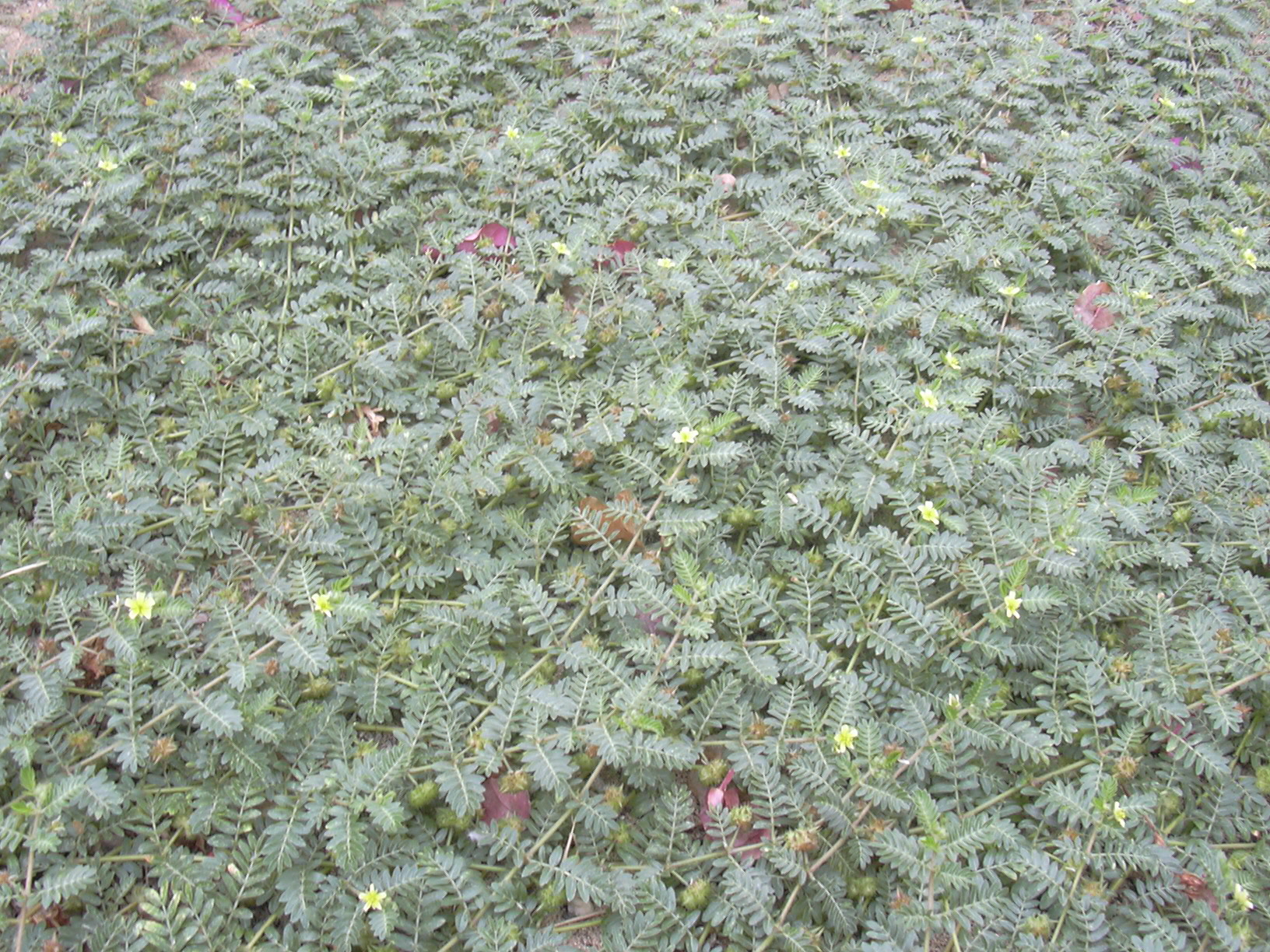
Ground covered in Tribulus terrestris

In areas where it is an invasive species, T. terrestris is often sought to be eradicated. However, T. terrestris is considered a hardy plant, and its seeds remain viable for up to three years, making complete eradication difficult. T. terrestris grows well in barren and disturbed soil, but does not thrive in soil that is already colonized by a vigorous ground-cover. Preventing a new outbreak of T. terrestris is the most effective strategy. In barren, compacted soil, cultivate the soil and plant ground-cover to exclude T. terrestris. Cover disturbed soil with a barrier that will keep seeds from being deposited. Where ground-cover is newly planted, diligently monitor to ensure no T. terrestris seeds have sprouted in the area.

=== Physical eradication ===
T. terrestris can be cleared manually by using a multi-year removal and suppression strategy. Removing the plant should be done before or during flowering to prevent seed formation (late spring and early summer in many areas). Removal can be entire, by gripping the plant at the top of the taproot and pulling upward; or partial, by using a hoe to cut the plant off at the taproot. Partial removal will allow regrowth, but may be the only option in compacted soil; in this case, repeated cutting will exhaust the plant's energy storage. This will greatly reduce the prevalence of the weed the following year. An effective multi-year strategy consists of continuing to pull or cut T. terrestris over the course of at least three years, preventing any new seeds from forming, and allowing the oldest viable seeds in the seed bank to sprout. To avoid recolonization, the area should be planted with a quality ground-covering plant that will block light and access to bare soil, and develop a root structure able to exclude or compete with T. terrestris.

Aerating compacted sites and planting competitive desirable plants, including broad-leaved grasses such as St. Augustine, can reduce the effect of T. terrestris by reducing resources available to the weed.

In June 2014, the town of Irrigon, Oregon, announced it would pay a bounty of one dollar for each large trash bag of puncturevine.

=== Chemical ===
When working to eradicate large areas of T. terrestris, a mix of manual and chemical removal is most effective. Chemical control poses risks to other plants, soil chemistry and biology, water quality, and animals; it should only be utilized if manual control is insufficiently effective. Pre-emergent chemicals can be most effective in combination with manual control; it prevents the annual seeds of T. terrestris from sprouting to make new plants. This, in combination with removal of existing plants, can swiftly exhaust the seed-bank. Products containing oryzalin, benefin, or trifluralin will provide partial control of germinating seeds. These must be applied prior to germination (late winter to midspring).

After plants have emerged from the soil (postemergent), products containing 2,4-dichlorophenoxyacetic acid (2,4-D), glyphosate, and dicamba are effective on T. terrestris. Like most postemergents, they are more effectively maintained when caught small and young. Dicamba and 2,4-D will cause harm to most broad-leaved plants, so the user should take care to avoid over-application. They can be applied to lawns without injuring the desired grass. Glyphosate will kill or injure most plants, so it should only be used as a spot treatment or on solid stands of the weed. A product from DuPont called Pastora is highly effective but expensive and not for lawn use.

=== Biological ===
Two weevils, Microlarinus lareynii and M. lypriformis, native to India, France, and Italy, were introduced into the United States as biocontrol agents in 1961. Both species of weevils are available for purchase from biological suppliers, but purchase and release is not often recommended because weevils collected from other areas may not survive at the purchaser's location.

Microlarinus lareynii is a seed weevil that deposits its eggs in the young burr or flower bud. The larvae feed on and destroy the seeds before they pupate, emerge, disperse, and start the cycle over again. Its life cycle time is 19 to 24 days. Microlarinus lypriformis is a stem weevil that has a similar life cycle, excepting the location of the eggs, which includes the undersides of stems, branches, and the root crown. The larvae tunnel in the pith where they feed and pupate. Adults of both species overwinter in plant debris. Although the stem weevil is slightly more effective than the seed weevil when each is used alone, the weevils are most effective if used together and the T. terrestris plant is moisture-stressed.

== Toxicity ==
Toxic compounds in the plant are known to cause liver damage when ingested at harmful dosages. When ingested, phylloerythrin accumulates in the blood as a byproduct of chlorophyll degradation; however, adverse reactions have not been confirmed in humans. In sheep, consumption of T. terrestris causes tribulosis, also known as 'geeldikkop', which is a type of photodermatitis. Two alkaloids that seem to cause limb paresis (staggers) in sheep that eat T. terrestris are the beta-carboline alkaloids harman (harmane) and norharman (norharmane). The alkaloid content of dried foliage is about 44 mg/kg.
