= Rectal bleeding =

- Other names: Rectal hemorrhage, rectorrhagia

Rectal bleeding refers to bleeding in the rectum, thus a form of lower gastrointestinal bleeding. There are many causes of rectal hemorrhage, including inflamed hemorrhoids (which are dilated vessels in the perianal fat pads), rectal varices, proctitis (of various causes), stercoral ulcers, and infections. Diagnosis is usually made by proctoscopy, which is an endoscopic test.

== Signs and symptoms ==
Those with rectal bleeding may notice bright red blood in their stool. Symptoms associated with rectal bleeding include having several bowel movements in a day, feelings of incomplete rectal evacuation, straining, hard or lumpy stools, feelings of urgency, loose or watery stools, and leakage of bowel movement.

== Causes ==
Bleeding from the rectal area could indicate premalignant polyps or colorectal cancer. Compared to colorectal cancer, anal lesions or benign colorectal conditions are far more common causes of rectal bleeding. Other causes of rectal bleeding include hemorrhoids, full-thickness rectal prolapse, fissures, sentinel tags, ulcers, rhagades, external thromboses with extravasation of blood clot, prolapsed polyps or tags, anal trauma or anal-receptive intercourse, abscess, fistula opening, dermatologic conditions of the perianal region, hypertrophied papilla, and distal proctitis. An ulcer could be caused by Crohn's disease, anal cancer, HIV, or another STD. Inflammatory bowel diseases may also cause rectal bleeding.

=== Risk factors ===
Certain medications, such as calcium channel blockers or proton pump inhibitors, can exacerbate anorectal symptoms by causing diarrhea or constipation, or they can exacerbate bleeding (e.g., Coumadin, nonsteroidal anti-inflammatory drugs). A history of hemorrhoidectomy, fissure surgery, fistula surgery, polypectomy, or colectomy may be relevant. Gastrointestinal symptoms can also result from other procedures like gastric bypass or cholecystectomy. Any prior assessment, such as a colonoscopy or flexible sigmoidoscopy, may also be important, as well as any history of polypectomy carried out in connection with one of these operations.

== Diagnosis ==
Any complaint of bleeding should be followed up with a complete blood count (CBC) in order to determine the extent of the bleeding and guide treatment. The partial thromboplastin time (PTT) and the international normalized ratio (INR), which can be used to detect bleeding tendencies, are additional crucial lab tests to obtain.

Testing for STIs, such as gonorrhea and chlamydia, should be conducted on patients who engage in anal receptive sex. No matter if there are other clinical symptoms present or not, endoscopies are the gold standard for examining rectal bleeding and should be completed on patients over 40. To check for a distal source of bleeding, such as internal hemorrhoids, proctitis, rectal ulcers, malignancies, or varices, one can use an anoscope or rigid procto-sigmoidoscope. When proximal lower GI pathology is suspected, a colonoscopy needs to be performed.

If there is a significant amount of bleeding or the patient is too unstable to be put under anesthesia for an endoscopic procedure, CT angiography may be pursued. It could be challenging to pinpoint the precise location of the blood if there is a lot of blood in the stomach.

Tagged red blood cell scintigraphies are a precise way to locate the bleeding vessels and pinpoint the area where they are bleeding. It can be applied to chronic and recurrent rectal bleeding with no apparent cause.

== See also ==
- Lower gastrointestinal bleeding
- Blood in stool
  - Hematochezia
  - Fecal occult blood
  - Melena
