= Blood in stool =

Medical condition of blood in the feces

- Other names: Rectal Bleeding
- The transition from the upper to lower GI tract is considered to occur at the duodenal-jejunal junction, therefore small intestine is part of both the upper and lower GI tract. Other organs participate in digestion including the liver, gallbladder, and pancreas. Blood entering the upper GI tract travels further, therefore has more exposure to the GI system and can be partially digested into melena before leaving the system. Hematochezia generally occurs lower in the GI tract, and is much closer to its exit, although fast bleeds can occur in the upper system as well. Bleeding of the lower GI tract will typically appear as hematochezia and can vary in degree of seriousness. Slow bleeding from the ascending portion of the colon can result in partial digestion of the blood and the appearance of melena in the stool.
- Specialty: Gastroenterology
- Types: Hematochezia, melena

Blood in stool looks different depending on how early it enters the digestive tract—and thus how much digestive action it has been exposed to—and how much there is. The term can refer either to melena, with a black appearance, typically originating from upper gastrointestinal bleeding; or to hematochezia, with a red color, typically originating from lower gastrointestinal bleeding. Evaluation of the blood found in stool depends on its characteristics, in terms of color, quantity and other features, which can point to its source, but more serious conditions can present with a mixed picture, or with the form of bleeding that is found in another section of the tract. The term "blood in stool" is usually only used to describe visible blood, and not fecal occult blood, which is found only after physical examination and chemical laboratory testing.

In infants, the Apt test, a test that is particularly useful in cases where a newborn has blood in stool or vomit, can be used to distinguish fetal hemoglobin from maternal blood based on the differences in composition of fetal hemoglobin as compared to the hemoglobin found in adults. A non-harmful cause of neonatal bleeding include swallowed maternal blood during birth; However, serious causes include Necrotizing Enterocolitis (NEC), a severe inflammatory condition affecting premature infants, and midgut volvulus, a life-threatening twisting that requires emergency surgery.

== Differential diagnoses ==
Blood in the stool can come from many sources. The causes range from not harmful to very serious conditions. A common way to divide causes of bleeding is based on the source of bleeding. The GI tract can be divided into upper and lower, with some causes of bleeding affecting the entire tract (upper and lower). Blood in the stool often appears different depending on its source. These differences can help when diagnosing these conditions. The rate of bleeding can also make blood in the stool look different from typical cases.

=== Upper GI tract ===
The upper GI tract is defined as the organs involved in digestion above the ligament of Treitz and comprises the esophagus, stomach, and duodenum. Upper gastrointestinal bleeding is typically characterized by melena (black stool). Bright red blood may be seen with active, rapid bleeding.

=== Pathophysiology ===
The development of blood in a person's stool results from a variety of conditions, which can be divided into major categories of disease. These broad categories include cancerous processes or abnormal structure of bowel wall, inflammatory disease, colitis caused by infection or medications and vascular compromise.

=== Cancer ===
- Colorectal cancer
- Gastric cancer

=== Gut wall changes ===
==== Motility ====
The gut wall is important for the movement of waste products through the GI tract. Repetitive attempts to have a bowel movement can lead to tearing around the exit of the rectum (anal fissure)

- Constipation

==== Structural ====
This list of diagnoses include diseases in which the wall of the bowel is compromised by disease.

- Peptic ulcer disease—divided into either duodenal or gastric ulcers, most common causes include:
  - Nonsteroidal anti-inflammatory drugs—the use of these medications results in a structural change in the wall of the gut, namely ulcers, and potential blood in the stool.
  - H. pylori infection—this bacterial infection can erode the wall of the stomach or duodenum, leading to a structural change in the stomach wall and bleeding in the stool.
  - Chronic disease
- Diverticulitis and diverticulosis result from an out pouching of the colonic mucosa, or gut wall, leading to a breakdown of weak gut wall and an increased susceptibility to infection due to the bacteria in the GI tract, thus the potential for vascular compromise, the collection of bacteria in the area of perforation (abscess), the abnormal formation of communication between another part of the hollow GI tract (fistula), or blockage of the bowel (obstruction).
- Meckel's diverticulum is a congenital remnant of the omphalo-mesenteric duct that connected the fetal yolk sac to the intestines which is normal closed off and destroyed during the process of development. If a portion, or all of this duct remains a diverticulum or fistula can result, leading to the potential for a source of bleeding.

==== Inflammatory bowel ====
Diseases causing inflammation in the GI tract can lead to blood in the stool. Inflammation can occur anywhere along the GI tract in Crohn's disease, or in the colon if a person has ulcerative colitis.

- Crohn's disease
- Ulcerative colitis

=== Colitis ===
- Enteritis—inflammation of the small intestine, which has many causes including autoimmune conditions (e.g. Crohn's disease), certain drugs (e.g. ibuprofen), radiation therapy, and Coeliac disease.

==== Infectious colitis ====
- Food poisoning—the bacteria that is associated with bloody diarrhea is typically E. coli
- Campylobacter enteritis
- Shigellosis
- Salmonellosis (Salmonella enteritis/Salmonella enterocolitis)
- Bacterial gastroenteritis
  - Campylobacter jejuni
  - Clostridioides difficile
  - Escherichia coli enteritis—most common cause of travelers' diarrhea
  - Salmonella enterica
  - Shigella dysenteriae see also dysentery
- Staphylococcus aureus
- Entamoeba histolytica

==== Drug-induced colitis ====
- Radiation enteritis

=== Vascular compromise ===
- Angiodysplasia of the GI tract
- Arteriovenous malformation
- Anal fissure
- Anal intercourse
- Esophageal varices
- Hemorrhoids
  - Internal hemorrhoids are covered by a layer of mucosa and epithelium, making them more likely to bleed, but typically do not cause pain.
  - External hemorrhoids are less likely to bleed, they are covered by a different type of epithelium (squamous) but can cause significant pain as a result of thrombosis of the blood vessels within them.
- Polypectomy during a colonoscopy can lead to a small amount of bleeding seen in the stool after the procedure

=== Other causes ===
- Blood in the diet, for example, the traditional diet of the Maasai includes much blood drawn from cattle.

== Diagnosis ==
The tests that are considered to evaluate of the passage of blood in the stool are based on the characteristics of bleeding (color, quantity) and whether or not the person passing blood has a low blood pressure with elevated heart rate, as opposed to normal vital signs. The following tests are combined to determine the causes of the source of bleeding.

- Digital rectal exam and fecal occult blood test
- Colonoscopy
- Anoscopy
- Blind taste test
- Esophagogastroduodenoscopy
- Capsule endoscopy
- CT Scan

Melena is defined as dark, tarry stools, often black in color due to partial digestion of the red blood cells.

Hematochezia is defined as bright red blood seen in the toilet either inside of, or surrounding the stool.

Hematochezia is typically presumed to come from the lower portion of the GI tract, and the initial steps of diagnosis include a digital rectal exam with fecal occult blood test, which if positive, will lead to a colonoscopy. If the person has a large amount of blood in their stool, an Esophagogastroduodenoscopy test may be necessary. If no source of bleeding is found on these examinations, a capsule endoscopy may be performed, in order to more closely examine the small bowel, which cannot be seen with the other types of studies. With melena, a digital rectal exam with fecal occult blood test is often also performed, however the suspicion for a source from the upper GI tract is higher, leading first to the use of esophagogastroduodenoscopy with the other tests being required if no source is identified. The anoscopy is another type of examination, which can be used along with a colonoscopy, which exams the rectum and distal portion of the descending colon.

Color	Medical term	Frequency	Quantity	Examples of types of bleeding considered
Bright red	Hematochezia	Occasional occurrence of blood	Small	Hemorrhoids, inflammatory conditions, polyps
Bright red	Hematochezia	Increased stooling, blood with every stool	Large	Rapid bleeding, e.g. ulcer, varices
Dark red/black	Melena	Blood with every stool	Difficult to measure, mixed in with stool	Slow bleeding, cancer, ulcer, (peptobismol and iron use can be mimics)

=== Other features ===
Mucus may also be found in stool.

A texture described as tarry stool is generally associated with dark black stool seen in partially digested blood. This is generally associated with melena.

=== Patient age ===
A person's age is an important consideration when assessing the cause of the bleeding.

Age	Group	Types of bleeding considered
<20 years	Pediatric	Inherited/autoimmune condition or structural
20–60 years	Middle aged	Inherited/autoimmune condition, vascular malformation
>60 years	Elderly	Vascular malformation, liver disease, cancer

== Treatment ==
Treatment of bloody stool depends largely on the cause of the bleeding. Bleeding is commonly associated with symptoms of fatigue, dizziness, headaches, or even shortness of breath, and these associated symptoms also require treatment. These symptoms are the result of blood loss, and occur due to a lack of red blood cells circulating in the vascular system, resulting in less oxygen reaching the tissues and organs. Blood in stool can be associated with serious complications as a result of blood volume loss (hemorrhage) or a slow leak of the blood leading to low levels of hemoglobin in the circulating blood (anemia).

=== Anemia ===
Anemia is a common complication of blood in the stool, especially when there is a large amount of blood or bleeding occurs over a long period of time. Anemia is also commonly associated with an iron deficiency, due to the importance of iron in the formation of red blood cells. When anemia is diagnosed as a result of blood in the stool, vitamins that are important for red blood cell formation (folate, vitamin B12, and vitamin C) are frequently prescribed in order to ensure that all the materials are available for those cells that are made.

=== Specific treatment ===
Diagnostic measures can be used as interventions to help stop bleeding in some cases. Bleeding that occurs due to a neoplasm (cancer growth) can be treated using colonoscopy and clipping, surgical intervention, or other measures, depending on the form and stage of cancer. Similarly, stomach cancer is treated depending on the staging, although typically requires surgical and medical therapy.

The treatment for gut motility issues, such as constipation, is typically to improve the movement of waste through the GI tract. This is done by using stool softeners (which work by pulling water into the stool while in the colon), addition of fiber to the diet, and use of osmotic laxatives (which help fluid movement through the colon, improving overall motility). Improving a person's gut motility can reduce the straining during defecation and decrease the risk of developing anal fissures. Anal fissures are associated with pain and blood on the toilet paper, and require time for healing. Treatment includes topical nitrates or calcium channel blockers and surgical interventions for chronic or complex cases. Similar to anal fissures, internal hemorrhoids can cause blood on the tissue when wiping, and be felt at the opening of the anus. Treatment options for hemorrhoids can be dependent on whether an underlying cause exists. An anorectal varices related hemorrhoids caused by cirrhosis, however symptomatic treatment often involves removal.

Colitis can be divided into infectious and drug induced, as can the treatment for these conditions. With infectious colitis, treatment is pathogen dependent, and generally requires the use of antibiotics. With drug-induced colitis, treatment typically involves removal of the offending agent, as is the case in nonsteroidal anti-inflammatory drugs induced peptic ulcer disease, however, removing radiation from a cancer patient is not always practical within a treatment regimen, so medical treatment is the primary mode of treatment.

Structural compromise leading to blood in stool is caused by a variety of conditions, and therefore requires different treatment for each condition. Peptic ulcer disease alone can be divided into multiple causes, but is generally initially controlled primarily with a proton pump inhibitor, with the addition of an H_{2} blocker, or in serious cases, requiring surgical intervention. Diverticulitis and diverticulosis require antibiotic treatment, and may require surgical intervention.

Inflammatory bowel disease is also divided into separate conditions, namely ulcerative colitis and Crohn's disease, which have different medical treatment regimens, and may require surgical intervention in more serious conditions.

== See also ==
- Fecal occult blood
