= Fecal occult blood =

Blood in the feces that is not visibly apparent

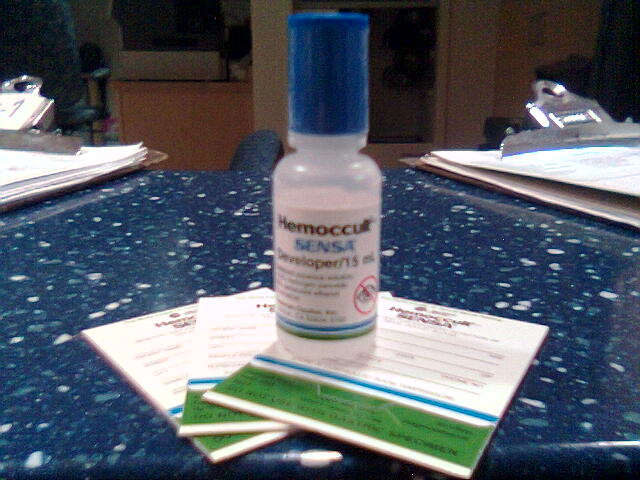
- Cards and bottle used for the hemoccult test, a type of stool guaiac test
- Specialty: Gastroenterology, general surgery

Fecal occult blood (FOB) refers to blood in the feces that is not visibly apparent (unlike other types of blood in stool such as melena or hematochezia). A fecal occult blood test (FOBT) checks for hidden (occult) blood in the stool (feces).

The American College of Gastroenterology has recommended the abandoning of the guaiac fecal occult blood test (gFOBT) as a colorectal cancer screening tool, in favor of the fecal immunochemical test (FIT). The newer and recommended tests look for globin, DNA, or other blood factors including transferrin, while conventional stool guaiac tests look for heme.

== Medical uses ==
Fecal occult blood testing (FOBT), as its name implies, aims to detect subtle blood loss in the gastrointestinal tract, anywhere from the mouth to the colon. Positive tests ("positive stool") may result from either upper gastrointestinal bleeding or lower gastrointestinal bleeding and warrant further investigation for peptic ulcers or a malignancy (such as colorectal cancer or gastric cancer). The test does not directly detect colon cancer but is often used in clinical screening for that disease. It can also be used to look for active occult blood loss in anemia or when there are gastrointestinal symptoms.

=== Colorectal cancer screening ===
An estimated 1–5% of large tested populations have a positive fecal occult blood test. Of those, about 2–10% have cancer, while 20–30% have adenomas. Screening methods for colon cancer depend on detecting either precancerous changes such as certain kinds of polyps or on finding early and thus more treatable cancer. The extent to which screening procedures reduce the risk of gastrointestinal cancer or deaths depends on the rate of precancerous and cancerous disease in that population. gFOBT (guaiac fecal occult blood test) and flexible sigmoidoscopy screening have each shown benefit. Other colon cancer screening tools such as iFOBT (immunochemical fecal occult blood test) or colonoscopy are also included in guidelines.

In 2009, the American College of Gastroenterology (ACG) suggested that colon cancer screening modalities that are also directly preventive by removing precursor lesions should be given precedence, and prefer a colonoscopy every ten years in average-risk individuals, beginning at age 50. The ACG suggests that cancer detection tests such as any type of FOB are an alternative that is less preferred, and if a colonoscopy is declined, the FIT (fecal immunochemical test, or iFOBT) should be offered instead. The 2017 US Multi-Society Task Force (MSTF)'s recommended first-tier tests are a colonoscopy every 10 years or annual FIT test. If FIT is utilized, proper steps must be taken to ensure appropriate use and follow-up of abnormal FIT results. FIT tests however are not that useful in picking up adenomas, even when advanced.

The United States Preventive Services Task Force (USPSTF)'s 2016 recommendation, instead of emphasizing specific screening approaches, has instead chosen to highlight that there is convincing evidence that colorectal cancer screening substantially reduces deaths from the disease among adults aged 50 to 75 years and that not enough adults are using this effective preventive intervention. The ACG and MSTF also included CT colonography every five years, and fecal DNA testing as considerations. All three recommendation panels recommended replacing any older low-sensitivity, guaiac-based fecal occult blood testing (gFOBT) with either newer high-sensitivity guaiac-based fecal occult blood testing (hs gFOBT) or fecal immunochemical testing (FIT). MSTF looked at six studies that compared high-sensitivity gFOBT (Hemoccult SENSA) to FIT, and concluded that there was no clear difference in overall performance between these methods.

The English National Health Service (NHS) introduced a Bowel Cancer Screening Program in 2006. It is now offered to patients aged 60–74 years. In 2019 FIT was introduced as the primary screening test in England and Wales, replacing gFOBt. However, research carried out in the UK has suggested that the FIT threshold for further investigation is set at a point that may miss more than half of bowel cancer cases and only identifies one in four high-risk polyps.

The American College of Gastroenterology has recommended the abandoning of gFOBT testing as a colorectal cancer screening tool, in favor of the fecal immunochemical test. Though the FIT test is preferred, even the guaiac FOB testing of average risk populations may have been sufficient to reduce the mortality associated with colon cancer by about 25%. With this lower efficacy, it was not always cost-effective to screen a large population with gFOBT.

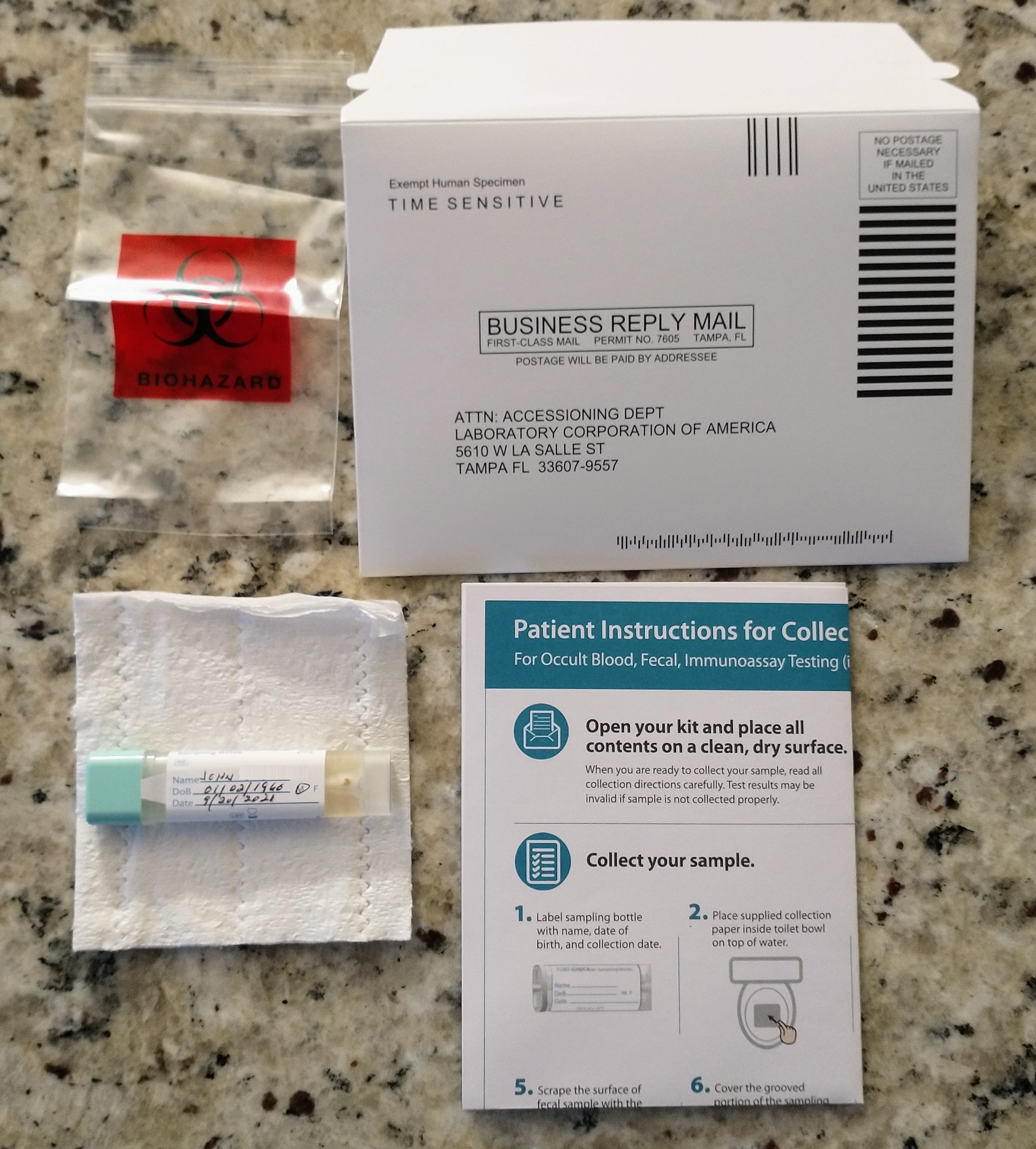
A LabCorp fecal occult blood immunoassay testing kit.

If colon cancer is suspected in an individual (such as in someone with an unexplained anemia), fecal occult blood tests may not be clinically helpful. If a doctor suspects colon cancer, more rigorous investigation is necessary, whether or not the test is positive.

In 2006, the Australian Government introduced the National Bowel Cancer Program which has been updated several times since; targeted screening will be done of all Australians aged from 50 to 74 by 2020. Cancer Council Australia recommended that FOBT should be done every two years. People over 50 not yet eligible for the national program can arrange with their doctor for an FOBT. The Canadian Cancer Society recommends that men and women aged 50 and over have an FOBT at least every two years. In colon cancer screening, using only one sample of feces collected by a doctor performing a digital rectal examination is discouraged.

The use of the M2-PK Test is encouraged over gFOBT for routine screening, as it may pick up tumors whether or not they are bleeding. It is able to detect 80 percent of colorectal cancers and 44 percent for adenoma > 1 centimeter, while gFOBT picks up 13 to 50 percent of colorectal cancers.

=== Other sources of bleeding ===
Gastrointestinal bleeding has many potential sources, and positive results usually result in further testing for the bleeding site, usually looking for lower gastrointestinal bleeding before upper gastrointestinal bleeding causes unless there are other clues. Colonoscopy is usually preferred to computerized tomographic colonography.

A positive test can result from upper gastrointestinal bleeding or lower gastrointestinal bleeding. The common causes are:

- 2–10%: cancer (colorectal cancer, gastric cancer)
- 20–30% adenoma or polyps
- Diverticular disease
- Hemorrhoids
- Inflammatory bowel disease
- Angiodysplasia of the colon
- Sickle cell anemia

In the event of a positive fecal occult blood test, the next step in the workup is a form of visualization of the gastrointestinal tract by one of several means:

1. Sigmoidoscopy, an examination of the rectum and lower colon with a lighted instrument to look for abnormalities, such as polyps.
2. Colonoscopy, a more thorough examination of the rectum and entire colon.
3. Virtual colonoscopy
4. Upper gastrointestinal endoscopy. It is sometimes performed with chromoendoscopy, a method that assists the endoscopist by enhancing the visual difference between cancerous and normal tissue, by either marking the abnormally increased DNA content (toluidine blue) or failing to stain the tumor, possibly due to decreased surface glycogen on tumor cells(Lugol). Infrared fluorescent endoscopy and ultrasonic endoscopy can interrogate vascular abnormalities such as esophageal varices.
5. Double-contrast barium enema: a series of x-rays of the colon and rectum.

=== Testing secretions for blood ===
The use of an FOBT for bleeding from the mouth, nose, esophagus, lungs, stomach and the initial portion of the small intestine, while the same as fecal testing, is discouraged, due to technical considerations including poorly characterized test performance characteristics such as sensitivity, specificity, and analytical interference. However, chemical confirmation that coloration is due to blood rather than coffee, beets, medications, or food additives can be of significant clinical assistance.

== Marathon runners ==
Gastrointestinal (GI) complaints and low-intensity GI bleeding frequently occur in marathon runners. Strenuous exercise, particularly in elite athlete runners and less frequently in other exercise activities, can cause acute incapacitating gastrointestinal symptoms including heartburn, nausea, vomiting, abdominal pain, diarrhea and gastrointestinal bleeding. Approximately one third of endurance runners experience transient but exercise-limiting symptoms, and repetitive gastrointestinal bleeding occasionally causes iron deficiency and anaemia. Runners can sometimes experience significant symptoms including hematemesis. Exercise is associated with extensive changes in gastrointestinal (GI) tract physiology, including diversion of blood flow from the GI tract to muscles and lungs, decreased GI absorption and small intestinal motility, increased colonic transit, neuroimmunoendocrine changes in hormones and peptides such as vasoactive intestinal peptide, secretin and peptide-histidine-methionine. Substantial changes occur in stress hormones including cortisol, in circulating concentrations and metabolic behavior of various leucocytes, and in immunoglobulin levels and major histocompatibility complex expression. Symptoms can be exacerbated by dehydration or by pre-exercise ingestion of certain foods and hypertonic liquids, and lessened by adequate training.

Ingestion of 800 mg of cimetidine two hours before running a marathon did not significantly affect the frequency of gastrointestinal symptoms or occult gastrointestinal bleeding. Conversely, 800 mg of cimetidine 1 hr before the start and again at 50 miles of a 100-mile running race substantially decreased GI symptoms and post-race guaiac test positivity but did not affect race performance.

== Methodology ==
There are four methods in clinical use to test for occult blood in feces. These look at different properties, such as antibodies, heme, globin, or porphyrins in blood, or at DNA from cellular material such as from lesions of the intestinal mucosa.

- Fecal immunochemical testing (FIT), and immunochemical fecal occult blood test (iFOBT). FIT products utilize specific antibodies to detect globin. FIT screening is more effective in terms of health outcomes and cost compared with guaiac FOBT. According to the guidelines of the American College of Gastroenterology, "Annual fecal immunochemical testing is the preferred colorectal cancer detection test." A FIT test detects globin levels in feces at or above 50 nanograms per mL, the established cutoff by the World Health Organization for Colorectal Cancer Screening. FIT testing has replaced most gFOBT tests as the colon cancer screening test of choice. This methodology can be adapted for automated test reading and to report quantitative results, which are potential factors in design of a widescale screening strategy. The number of fecal samples submitted for FIT may affect the clinical sensitivity and specificity of the methodology.[8] High-sensitivity gFOBT tests such as Hemoccult SENSA remain an accepted option[8] and may retain a role in monitoring gastrointestinal conditions such as ulcerative colitis; however, the FIT test is preferred in recent guidelines. FIT is widely used outside of the US, and generally costs less than US$20 per test in 2020, compared to US$1,000 or more for a colonoscopy.

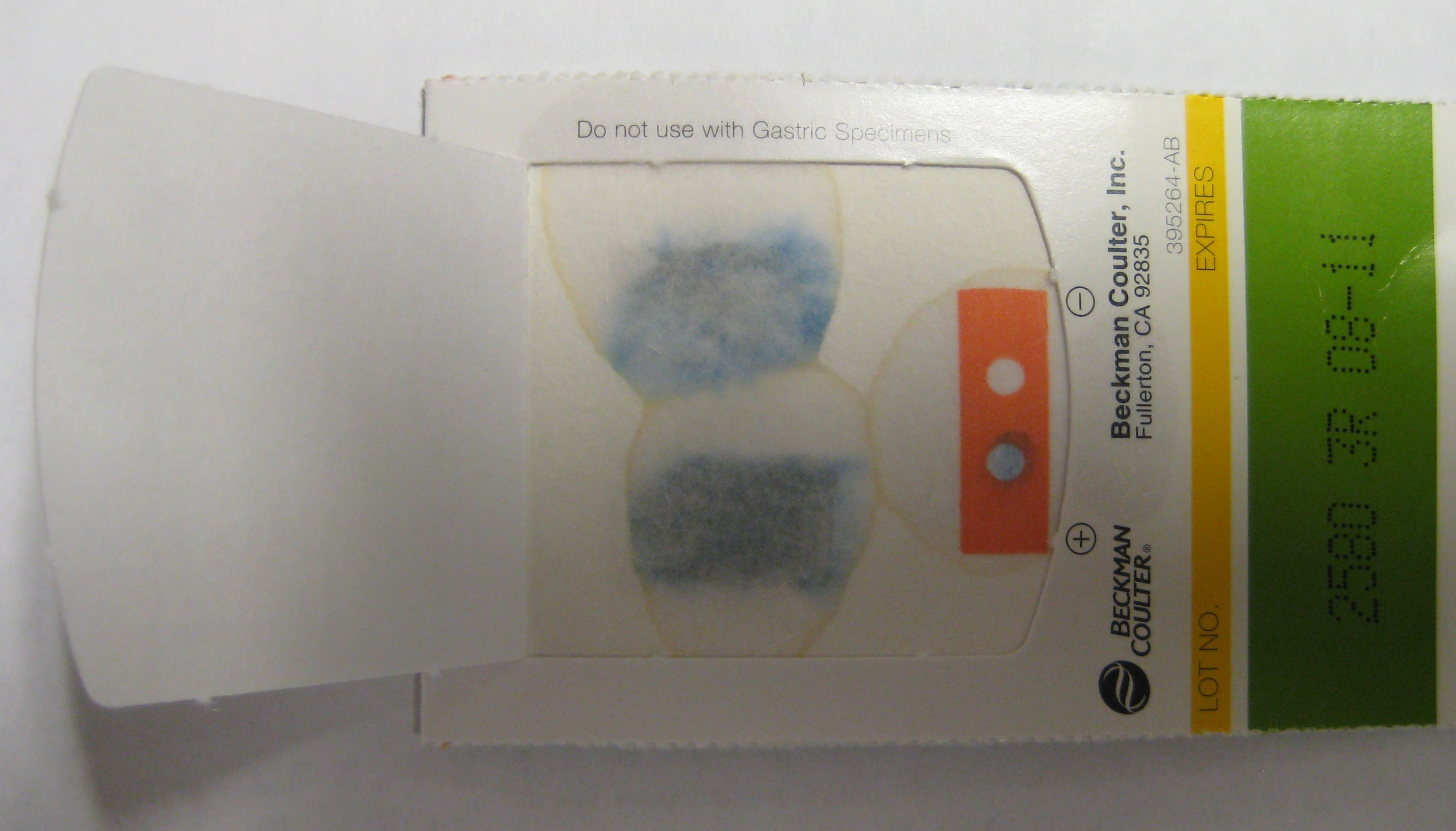
A positive traditional guaiac fecal occult blood test

- Stool guaiac test for fecal occult blood (gFOBT): – The stool guaiac test involves smearing some feces onto some absorbent paper that has been treated with a chemical. Hydrogen peroxide is then dropped onto the paper; if trace amounts of blood are present, the paper will change color in one or two seconds. This method works as the heme component in hemoglobin has a peroxidase-like effect, rapidly breaking down hydrogen peroxide. In some settings such as gastric or proximal upper intestinal bleeding, the guaiac method may be more sensitive than tests detecting globin because globin is broken down in the upper intestine to a greater extent than is heme. There are various commercially available gFOBT tests which have been categorized as being of low or high sensitivity, and only high-sensitivity tests remain an acceptable alternative to FIT testing, which is now the best-practices recommendation in colon cancer screening. Optimal clinical performance of the stool guaiac test depends on preparatory dietary adjustment. The stool guaiac test for hidden (occult) blood in the stool should be used at home following the test kit's directions with spontaneously passed stool or on samples submitted to a clinical laboratory. Testing kits are available at pharmacies in some countries without a prescription, or a health professional may order a testing kit for use at home. If a home fecal occult blood test detects blood in the stool it is recommended to see a health professional to arrange further testing.
- Stool DNA screening tests look for DNA alterations that have been associated with cancer.

Additional methods of looking for occult blood are being explored, including transferrin dipstick and stool cytology.

== Test performance ==
=== Reference standards ===
The estimates for test performance characteristics are based on comparison with a variety of reference methods including 51-chromium studies, analytical recovery studies in spiked stool samples, analytical recovery after ingestion of autologous blood, rarer studies of carefully quantified blood instilled at bowel surgery, as well as other research approaches. Additionally, clinical studies look at a variety of additional factors.

=== Gastrointestinal blood loss ===
In healthy people about 0.5 to 1.5 ml of blood escapes blood vessels into the stool each day. Significant amounts of blood can be lost without producing visible blood in the stool, estimated as 200 ml in the stomach, 100 ml in the duodenum, and lesser amounts in the lower intestine. Tests for occult blood identify lesser blood loss.

=== Clinical sensitivity and specificity ===
Fecal immunochemical testing (FIT) can identify as little as 0.3 ml of daily blood in the stool; yet this test threshold does not cause undue false positives from normal upper intestinal blood leakage because it does not detect occult blood from the stomach and upper small intestine. Thus, the FIT test is much more specific for bleeding from the colon or lower gastrointestinal tract than alternatives. The detection rate of the test decreases if the time from sample collection to laboratory processing is delayed; processing the sample in under five days from collection is recommended. It does not appear to be affected by aspirin, anticoagulants, or nonsteroidal anti-inflammatory drugs.

Stool guaiac test for fecal occult blood (gFOBT) sensitivity varies depending on the site of bleeding. Moderately sensitive gFOBT can pick up a daily blood loss of about 10 ml (about two teaspoonfuls), and higher sensitivity gFOBT can pick up lesser amounts, requires at least 2 ml to become positive. The sensitivity of a single-stool guaiac test to pick up bleeding has been quoted at 10 to 30%, but if a standard three tests are done as recommended the sensitivity rises to 92%. Reduced patient compliance with the collection of three samples hampers the usefulness of this test. Further discussion of sensitivity and specificity issues that relate particularly to the guaiac method is found in the stool guaiac test article.

Fecal porphyrin quantification by HemoQuant can yield a false positive result due to exogenous blood and various porphyrins. HemoQuant is the most sensitive test for upper gastrointestinal bleeding and therefore may be most appropriate fecal occult blood test to use in the evaluation of iron deficiency. It is advisable to stop ingesting red meat and aspirin for three days prior to specimen collection. False positives can occur with myoglobin, catalase, or protohemes and in certain types of porphyria.

Fecal DNA tests as of 2008 had not been studied enough to support widespread use.

== Regulation ==
Safety regulations from US accreditor the Joint Commission may have unintentionally decreased digital rectal examination and FOBT in hospital settings such as Emergency Departments.
