= Lower gastrointestinal bleeding =

Bleeding in the small and large intestine

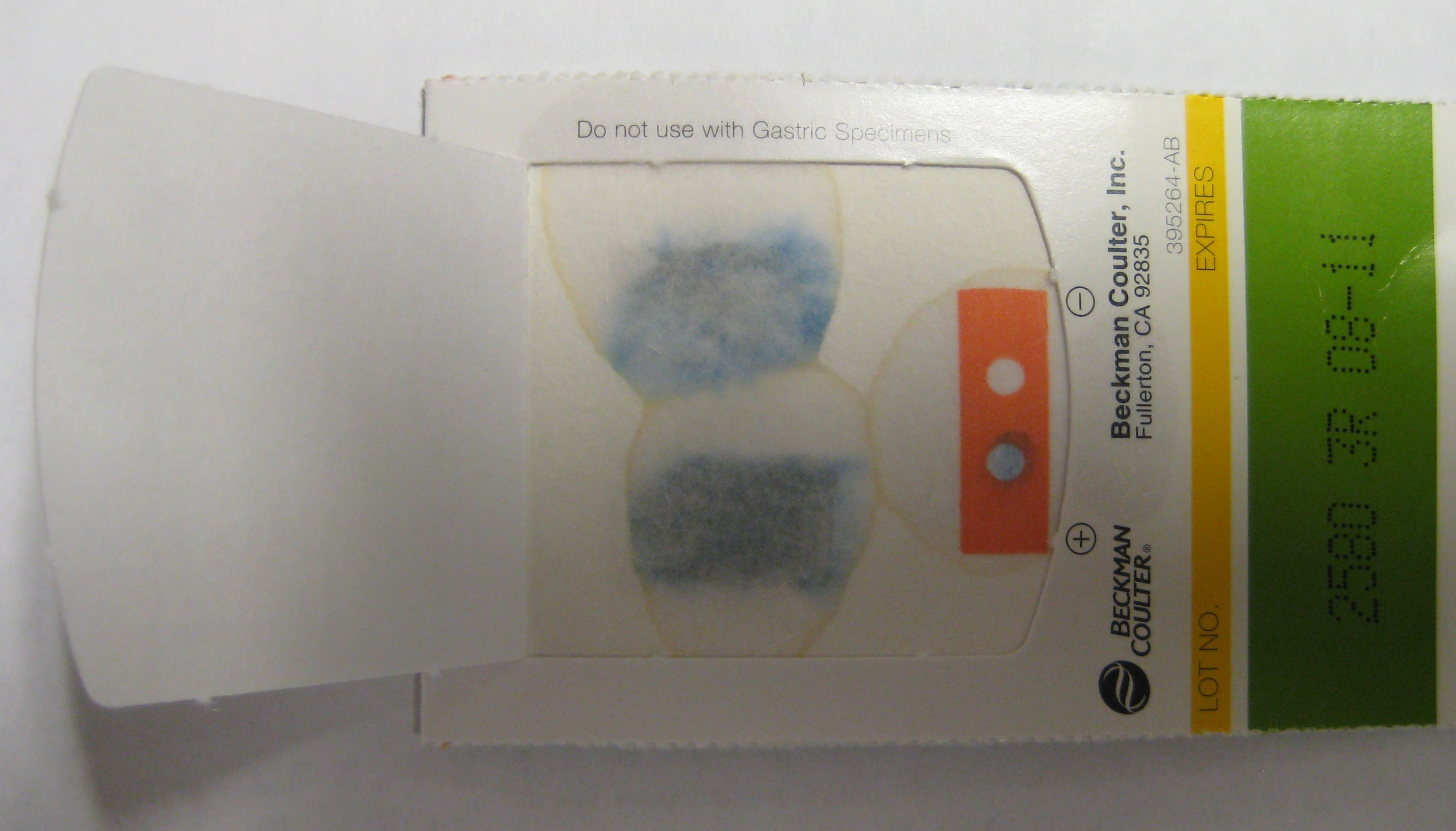
- Positive fecal occult blood test
- Specialty: Gastroenterology
- Symptoms: Bright blood in stool, dark blood in vomit

Lower gastrointestinal bleeding (LGIB) is any form of gastrointestinal bleeding in the lower gastrointestinal tract. LGIB is a common reason for seeking medical attention at a hospital's emergency department. LGIB accounts for 30–40% of all gastrointestinal bleeding and is less common than upper gastrointestinal bleeding (UGIB). It is estimated that UGIB accounts for 100–200 per 100,000 cases versus 20–27 per 100,000 cases for LGIB. Approximately 85% of lower gastrointestinal bleeding involves the large intestine, 10% are from bleeds that are actually upper gastrointestinal bleeds, and 3–5% involve the small intestine.

== Signs and symptoms ==
A lower gastrointestinal bleed is defined as bleeding originating distal to the ileocecal valve, which includes the colon, rectum, and anus. LGIB was previously defined as any bleed that occurs distal to the ligament of Treitz, which included the aforementioned parts of the intestine and also included the last 1/4 of the duodenum and the entire area of the jejunum and ileum. This has been divided into middle gastrointestinal bleeding (from the ligament of Treitz to the ileocecal valve) and lower gastrointestinal bleeding which involves a bleed anywhere from the ileocecal valve to the anus.

The stool of a person with a lower gastrointestinal bleed is a good (but not infallible) indication of where the bleeding is occurring. Black tarry appearing stools medically referred to as melena usually indicates blood that has been in the GI tract for at least 8 hours. Melena is four-times more likely to come from an upper gastrointestinal bleed than from the lower GI tract; however, it can also occur in either the duodenum and jejunum, and occasionally the portions of the small intestine and proximal colon. Bright red stool, called hematochezia, is the sign of a fast moving active GI bleed. The bright red or maroon color is due to the short time taken from the site of the bleed and the exiting at the anus. The presence of hematochezia is six-times greater in a LGIB than with a UGIB.

Occasionally, a person with a LGIB will not present with any signs of internal bleeding, especially if there is a chronic bleed with ongoing low levels of blood loss. In these cases, a diagnostic assessment or pre-assessment should watch for other signs and symptoms that the patient may present with. These include, but are not limited to, hypotension, tachycardia, angina, syncope, weakness, confusion, stroke, myocardial infarction/heart attack, and shock.

== Causes ==
The following are possible causes of a LGIB:

- Diverticular disease — diverticulosis, diverticulitis
- Colitis
  - Ischaemic colitis
  - Radiation colitis
  - Infectious colitis
  - Pseudomembranous colitis
    - E. coli O157:H7
    - Shigella
    - Salmonella
    - Campylobacter jejuni
- Hemorrhoids
- Neoplasm — such as colorectal cancer
- Angiodysplasia
- Bleeding from a site where a colonic polyp was removed
- Inflammatory bowel disease such as Crohn's disease or ulcerative colitis
- Rectal varices
- Coagulopathy — specifically a bleeding diathesis
- Anal fissures
- Rectal foreign bodies
- Mesenteric ischemia
- NSAIDs
- Entamoeba histolytica
- Stercoral ulceration
- Dieulafoy lesion (rare)

== Diagnosis ==
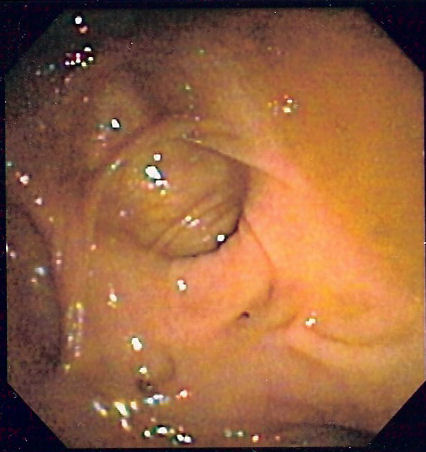
Diverticular disease – a cause of LGIBs

Diagnostic evaluation must be performed after patients have been adequately resuscitated. If an upper GI source is suspected, an upper endoscopy should be performed first. Lower gastrointestinal series evaluation can be performed with anoscopy, flexible sigmoidoscopy, colonoscopy, rarely barium enema, and various radiologic studies.

=== History ===
The history in these patients should focus on factors that could be associated with potential causes: blood coating the stool suggests hemorrhoidal bleeding while blood mixed in the stool implies a more proximal source; bloody diarrhea and tenesmus is associated with inflammatory bowel disease while bloody diarrhea with fever and abdominal pain especially with recent travel history suggests infectious colitis; pain with defecation occurs with hemorrhoids and anal fissure; change in stool caliber and weight loss is concerning for colon cancer; abdominal pain can be associated with inflammatory bowel disease, infectious colitis, or ischemic colitis; painless bleeding is characteristic of diverticular bleeding, arteriovenous malformation (AVM), and radiation proctitis; nonsteroidal anti-inflammatory drug (NSAID) use is a risk factor for diverticular bleeding and NSAID-induced colonic ulcer; and recent colonoscopy with polypectomy suggests postpolypectomy bleeding. Patients should be asked about symptoms of hemodynamic compromise, including dyspnea, chest pain, lightheadedness, and fatigue.

=== Physical findings ===
Orthostatic hypotension implies at least a 15% loss of blood volume and suggests a more severe bleeding episode. Evaluate for abdominal tenderness, masses, and enlargement of the liver and spleen. Additional key elements include a careful and thorough inspection of the anus, palpation for rectal masses, characterization of the stool color, and a stool guaiac card test to evaluate for the presence of blood.

=== Laboratory findings ===
Among the blood tests that should be performed are a complete blood count, prothrombin time, partial thromboplastin time, electrolytes, and typing and cross-matching for transfusion of blood products. A clotting abnormality and low platelet concentration in the blood should be immediately corrected if possible. Platelets should be maintained above 50,000/mL and clotting abnormalities should be corrected with vitamin K or fresh frozen plasma. Vitamin K should be taken orally unless the patient has cirrhosis or biliary obstruction, in which case it should be administered subcutaneously. The full effect of vitamin K is not obtained for 12–24 hours, unlike fresh frozen plasma which immediately reverses clotting abnormalities. The intravenous formulation of vitamin K reverses coagulopathy more quickly and may be used in cases of severe bleeding, however, patients should be monitored for anaphylaxis. The effects of fresh frozen plasma last about 3–5 hours and large volumes (> 2–3 L) may be required to completely reverse clotting abnormalities, depending on the initial prothrombin time. Recombinant activated factor VII has been approved for use in patients with hemophilia A and B with factor VIII and IX inhibitors. Evidence of possible benefit in patients with cirrhosis and GI bleeding has been demonstrated, although the optimal dose is unclear and recombinant activated factor VII is very expensive.

=== Anoscopy ===
Anoscopy is useful only for diagnosing bleeding sources from the anorectal junction and anal canal, including internal hemorrhoids and anal fissures. It is superior to flexible sigmoidoscopy for detecting hemorrhoids in an outpatient setting and can be performed quickly in the office or at the bedside as an adjunct to flexible sigmoidoscopy and colonoscopy.

=== Flexible sigmoidoscopy ===
Flexible sigmoidoscopy uses a 65-cm long sigmoidoscope that visualizes the left colon. It can be performed without sedation and only minimal preparation with enemas. However, the diagnostic yield of flexible sigmoidoscopy in acute lower GI bleeding is only 9%. The role of anoscopy and flexible sigmoidoscopy in inpatients with acute lower GI bleeding is limited, as most patients should undergo colonoscopy.

=== Colonoscopy ===
Colonoscopy is the test of choice in the majority of patients with acute Lower GI bleeding as it can be both diagnostic and therapeutic. The diagnostic accuracy of colonoscopy in lower GI bleeding ranges from 48% to 90%, and urgent colonoscopy appears to increase diagnostic yield. This wide range in yield is partially explained by different criteria for diagnosis, as often if no active bleeding, nonbleeding visible vessel, or adherent clot is found, bleeding is attributed to a lesion if blood is present in the area. The presence of fresh blood in the terminal ileum is presumed to indicate a non colonic source of bleeding. The overall complication rate of colonoscopy in acute lower GI bleeding is 1.3%. Bowel preparation is safe and well tolerated in most patients. The complication rate of colonoscopy in an unprepped colon may be higher. About 2–6% of colonoscopy preparations in acute lower GI bleeding are poor. Between 4 and 8 L of Golytely should be administered orally or via nasogastric tube until the effluence is clear.

== Management ==
Basic algorithm for the management of lower GI bleed.

In most cases requiring emergency hospital admission, the bleeding will resolve spontaneously. If a patient is suspected of having severe blood loss they will most likely be placed on a vital sign monitor and administered oxygen either by nasal cannula or simple face mask. An intravenous catheter will be placed into an easily accessible area and IV fluids will be administered to replace lost blood volume. Endoscopic evaluation with a colonoscopy (and possibly an esophagogastroduodenoscopy to exclude an UGIB) should typically occur within 24 hours of hospital presentation.

If the person with LGIB is on low-dose aspirin for prevention of a first heart attack (i.e., the person has never had a heart attack before), stopping the aspirin is recommended. In contrast, if the person has previously had a heart attack, the aspirin should be continued despite the active LGIB due to the benefits of preventing another heart attack and consequent death outweighing the risk of bleeding. Dual antiplatelet therapy (e.g., use of both aspirin and clopidogrel) should continue if the person with a LGIB underwent stenting of the heart's coronary arteries within the last 30 days or a recent acute coronary syndrome episode (e.g., unstable angina or a myocardial infarction) within 90 days of the LGIB event. Individuals at high risk of another heart attack but not meeting the above criteria should continue their aspirin during the LGIB event but stop the other antiplatelet medication for 1–7 days following cessation of the bleed.

Predicting which patients will develop adverse outcomes, complications or severe bleeding can be difficult. One recent study identified poor kidney function (creatinine > 150 μm), age over 60 years, abnormal haemodynamic parameters on presentation (low blood pressure) and persistent bleeding within the first 24 hours as risk factors for worse outcome.

Surgical intervention is warranted in cases of LGIB that persist despite attempts to stop the bleeding with endoscopic or interventional radiology interventions. It is most likely that a surgical consult will be ordered if the patient is unable to be stabilized by non-invasive techniques, or if a perforation is found that requires surgery (e.g., subtotal removal of the colon).
