= Ischemic colitis =

Inflammation of the large intestine due to insufficient blood supply

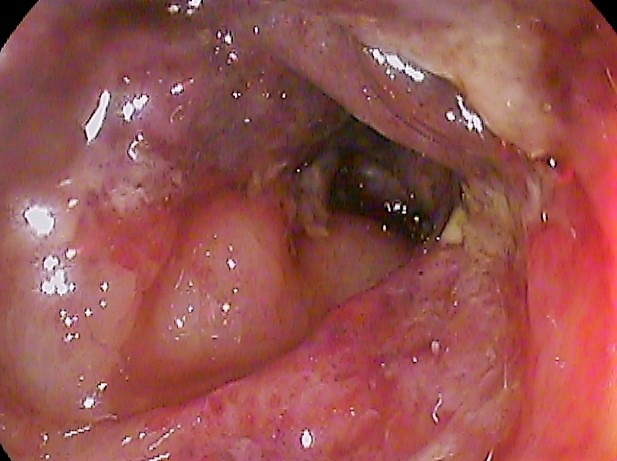
- Ischemic colitis on the transverse colon of an 82 year old female
- Specialty: Gastroenterology

Ischemic colitis (also spelled ischaemic colitis) is a medical condition in which inflammation and injury of the large intestine result from inadequate blood supply (ischemia). Although uncommon in the general population, ischemic colitis occurs with greater frequency in the elderly, and is the most common form of bowel ischemia. Causes of reduced blood flow can include changes in the systemic circulation (e.g. low blood pressure) or local factors such as constriction of blood vessels or a blood clot. In most cases, no specific cause can be identified.

Ischemic colitis is usually suspected on the basis of the clinical setting, physical examination, and laboratory test results; the diagnosis can be confirmed by endoscopy or by using sigmoid or endoscopic placement of a visible light spectroscopic catheter (see Diagnosis). Ischemic colitis can span a wide spectrum of severity; most patients are treated supportively and recover fully, while a minority with very severe ischemia may develop sepsis and become critically, sometimes fatally, ill.

Patients with mild to moderate ischemic colitis are usually treated with IV fluids, analgesia, and bowel rest (that is, no food or water by mouth) until the symptoms resolve. Those with severe ischemia who develop complications such as sepsis, intestinal gangrene, or bowel perforation may require more aggressive interventions such as surgery and intensive care. Most patients make a full recovery; occasionally, after severe ischemia, patients may develop long-term complications such as a stricture or chronic colitis.

== Signs and symptoms ==
Three progressive phases of ischemic colitis have been described:

- A hyperactive phase occurs first, in which the primary symptoms are severe abdominal pain and the passage of bloody stools. Many patients get better and do not progress beyond this phase.
- A paralytic phase can follow if ischemia continues; in this phase, the abdominal pain becomes more widespread, the belly becomes more tender to the touch, and bowel motility decreases, resulting in abdominal bloating, no further bloody stools, and absent bowel sounds on exam.
- Finally, a shock phase can develop as fluids start to leak through the damaged colon lining. This can result in shock and metabolic acidosis with dehydration, low blood pressure, rapid heart rate, and confusion. Patients who progress to this phase are often critically ill and require intensive care.

Symptoms of ischemic colitis vary depending on the severity of the ischemia. The most common early signs of ischemic colitis include abdominal pain (often left-sided), with mild to moderate amounts of rectal bleeding. The sensitivity of findings among 73 patients were:

- abdominal pain (78%)
- lower gastrointestinal tract bleeding (62%)
- diarrhea (38%)
- Fever higher than 38 °C (100.4 °F) (34%)

Physical examination

- abdominal pain (77%)
- abdominal tenderness (21%)

== Causes ==
Ischemic colitis is often classified according to the underlying cause. Non-occlusive ischemia develops because of low blood pressure or constriction of the vessels feeding the colon; occlusive ischemia indicates that a blood clot or other blockage has cut off blood flow to the colon.

=== Non-occlusive ischemia ===
In hemodynamically unstable patients (i.e. shock) the mesenteric perfusion may be compromised. This condition is commonly asymptomatic, and usually only apparent through a systemic inflammatory response.

=== Occlusive ischemia ===
Mostly the result of a thromboembolism. Commonly the embolism is caused by atrial fibrillation, valvular disease, myocardial infarction, or cardiomyopathy.

In addition, ischemic colitis is a well-recognized complication of abdominal aortic aneurysm repair, when the origin of the inferior mesenteric artery is covered by the aortic graft. In a 1991 review concerning 2137 patients the accidental inferior mesenteric artery ligation was the most common cause (74%) of ischemic colitis. Thus, patients without adequate collateralization are at risk for ischemia of the descending and sigmoid colon. Bloody diarrhea and leukocytosis in the postoperative period are essentially diagnostic of ischemic colitis. The complication can be prevented through careful selection of subjects that may require replanting inferior mesenteric artery (IMA) and completing the pre surgical procedure information with an instrumental evaluation during surgical treatment.

== Pathophysiology ==
=== Colonic blood supply ===
Colonic blood supply. Pink – supply from superior mesenteric artery (SMA) and its branches: middle colic, right colic, ileocolic arteries. Blue – supply from inferior mesenteric artery (IMA) and its branches: left colic, sigmoid, superior rectal artery. 7 is for so-called Cannon–Böhm point (the border between the areas of SMA and IMA supplies), which lies at the splenic flexure.

The colon receives blood from both the superior and inferior mesenteric arteries. The blood supply from these two major arteries overlaps, with abundant collateral circulation via the marginal artery of the colon. However, there are weak points, or "watershed" areas, at the borders of the territory supplied by each of these arteries, such as the splenic flexure and the rectosigmoid junction. These watershed areas are most vulnerable to ischemia when blood flow decreases, as they have the fewest vascular collaterals.

The rectum receives blood from both the inferior mesenteric artery and the internal iliac artery; the rectum is rarely involved by colonic ischemia due to this dual blood supply.

=== Development of ischemia ===
Under ordinary conditions, the colon receives between 10% and 35% of the total cardiac output. If blood flow to the colon drops by more than about 50%, ischemia will develop. The arteries feeding the colon are very sensitive to vasoconstrictors; presumably this is an evolutionary adaptation to shunt blood away from the bowel and to the heart and brain in times of stress. As a result, during periods of low blood pressure, the arteries feeding the colon clamp down vigorously; a similar process can result from vasoconstricting drugs such as ergotamine, cocaine, or vasopressors. This vasoconstriction can result in non-occlusive ischemic colitis.

=== Pathologic findings ===
A range of pathologic findings are seen in ischemic colitis, corresponding to the spectrum of clinical severity. In its mildest form, mucosal and submucosal hemorrhage and edema are seen, possibly with mild necrosis or ulceration. With more severe ischemia, a pathologic picture resembling inflammatory bowel disease (i.e. chronic ulcerations, crypt abscesses and pseudopolyps) may be seen. In the most severe cases, transmural infarction with resulting perforation may be seen; after recovery, the muscularis propria may be replaced by fibrous tissue, resulting in a stricture. Following restoration of normal blood flow, reperfusion injury may also contribute to the damage to the colon.

== Diagnosis ==
Ischemic colitis must be differentiated from the many other causes of abdominal pain and rectal bleeding (for example, infection, inflammatory bowel disease, diverticulosis, or colon cancer). It is also important to differentiate ischemic colitis, which often resolves on its own, from the more immediately life-threatening condition of acute mesenteric ischemia of the small bowel.

There are devices which test the sufficiency of oxygen delivery to the colon. The first device approved by the U.S. FDA in 2004 uses visible light spectroscopy to analyze capillary oxygen levels. Use during aortic aneurysm repair detected when colon oxygen levels fell below sustainable levels, allowing real-time repair. In several studies, specificity has been 90% or higher for acute colonic ischemia, and 83% for chronic mesenteric ischemia, with a sensitivity of 71–92%. This device must be placed using endoscopy, however.

=== Diagnostic tests ===
There is a recent optical test, but it requires endoscopy (see Diagnosis). There are no specific blood tests for ischemic colitis. The sensitivity of tests among 73 patients were:

- The white blood cell count was more than 15,000/mm3 in 20 patients (27%)
- The serum bicarbonate level was less than 24 mmol/L in 26 patients (36%)

Plain X-rays are often normal or show non-specific findings. In a series of 73 patients, plain abdominal radiography (56%) showing colic distension in 53% or a pneumoperitoneum in 3%.

CT scans are often used in the evaluation of abdominal pain and rectal bleeding, and may suggest the diagnosis of ischemic colitis, pick up complications, or suggest an alternate diagnosis.

Endoscopic evaluation, via colonoscopy or flexible sigmoidoscopy, is the procedure of choice if the diagnosis remains unclear. Ischemic colitis has a distinctive endoscopic appearance; endoscopy can also facilitate alternate diagnoses such as infection or inflammatory bowel disease. Biopsies can be taken via endoscopy to provide more information. Visible light spectroscopy, performed using catheters placed through the 5 mm channel of the endoscope, is diagnostic (see Diagnosis).

== Treatment ==
Except in the most severe cases, ischemic colitis is treated with supportive care. IV fluids are given to treat dehydration, and the patient is placed on bowel rest (meaning nothing to eat or drink) until the symptoms resolve. If possible, cardiac function and oxygenation should be optimized to improve oxygen delivery to the ischemic bowel. A nasogastric tube may be inserted if an ileus is present.

Antibiotics are sometimes given in moderate to severe cases; the data supporting this practice date to the 1950s, although there is more recent animal data suggesting that antibiotics may increase survival and prevent bacteria from crossing the damaged lining of the colon into the bloodstream. The use of prophylactic antibiotics in ischemic colitis has not been prospectively evaluated in humans, but many authorities recommend their use based on the animal data.

Patients being treated supportively are carefully monitored. If they develop worsening symptoms and signs such as high white blood cell count, fever, worsened abdominal pain, or increased bleeding, then they may require surgical intervention; this usually consists of laparotomy and bowel resection.

== Prognosis ==
Most patients with ischemic colitis recover fully, although the prognosis depends on the severity of the ischemia. Patients with pre-existing peripheral vascular disease or ischemia of the ascending (right) colon may be at increased risk for complications or death.

Non-gangrenous ischemic colitis, which comprises the vast majority of cases, is associated with a mortality rate of approximately 6%. However, the minority of patients who develop gangrene as a result of colonic ischemia have a mortality rate of 50–75% with surgical treatment; the mortality rate is almost 100% without surgical intervention.

=== Long-term complications ===
About 20% of patients with acute ischemic colitis may develop a long-term complication known as chronic ischemic colitis. Symptoms can include recurrent infections, bloody diarrhea, weight loss, and chronic abdominal pain. Chronic ischemic colitis is often treated with surgical removal of the chronically diseased portion of the bowel.

A colonic stricture is a band of scar tissue which forms as a result of the ischemic injury and narrows the lumen of the colon. Strictures are often treated observantly; they may heal spontaneously over 12–24 months. If a bowel obstruction develops as a result of the stricture, surgical resection is the usual treatment, although endoscopic dilatation and stenting have also been employed.

== Epidemiology ==
The exact incidence of ischemic colitis is difficult to estimate, as many patients with mild ischemia may not seek medical attention. Ischemic colitis is responsible for about 1 in 2000 hospital admissions and is seen on about 1 in 100 endoscopies. Men and women are affected equally; ischemic colitis is a disease of the elderly, with more than 90% of cases occurring in people over the age of 60.
