= F-Hemoglobin =

F-hemoglobin (F-Hb) usually refers to hemoglobin in blood from rectal bleeding (fecal hemoglobin), but may also refer to Hemoglobin F (fetal hemoglobin).
