= Aortoenteric fistula =

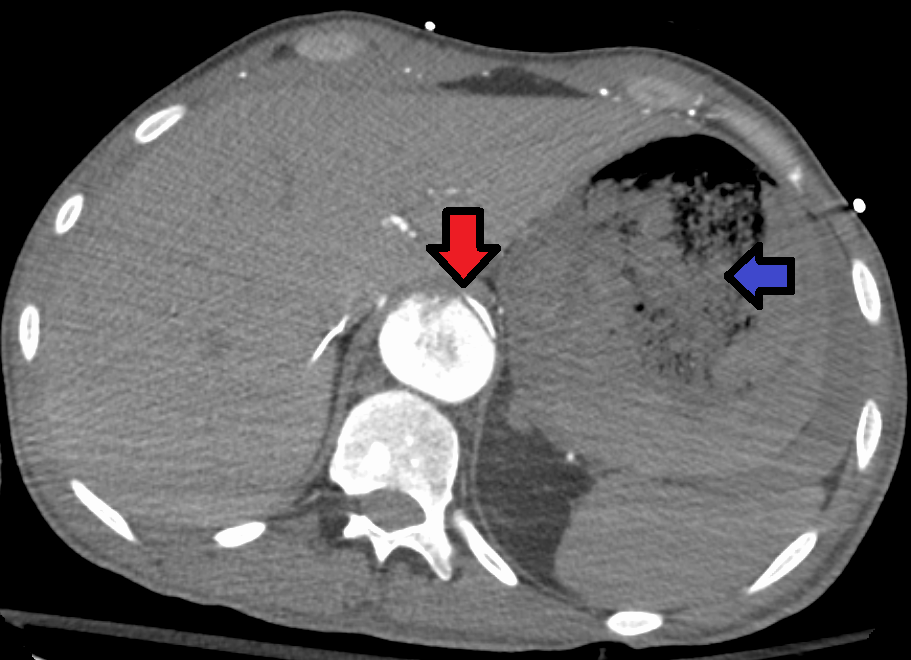
- Aorto enteric fistula and aortic dissection of the thoracic aorta. Arrow shows the flap in the aorta. Heterogeneity is blood in the stomach

An aortoenteric fistula is a connection between the aorta and the intestines, stomach, or esophageus. There can be significant blood loss into the intestines resulting in bloody stool and death. It is usually secondary to an abdominal aortic aneurysm repair. The third or fourth portion of the duodenum is the most common site for aortoenteric fistulas, followed by the jejunum and ileum.

== Diagnosis ==
Diagnosis is typically via a CT angiography, esophagogastroduodenoscopy, or arteriography. It is part of the differential diagnosis of gastrointestinal bleeding.
