= Stercoral ulcer =

- Specialty: Gastroenterology
- Symptoms: Hematochezia, Abdominal pain, Fever
- Causes: Constipation, Stercoral Colitis, Chagas disease, Hirschsprung's disease
- Diagnostic method: CT scan
- Prevention: Treatment of the causes of constipation

Stercoral ulcer is an ulcer of the colon due to pressure and irritation resulting from severe, prolonged constipation due to a large bowel obstruction, damage to the autonomic nervous system, or stercoral colitis. It is most commonly located in the sigmoid colon and rectum. Prolonged constipation leads to production of fecaliths, leading to possible progression into a fecaloma. These hard lumps irritate the rectum and lead to the formation of these ulcers. It results in fresh bleeding per rectum (i.e. hematochezia). These ulcers may be seen on imaging, such as a CT scan but are more commonly identified using endoscopy, usually a colonoscopy. Treatment modalities can include both surgical and non-surgical techniques.

== Signs and symptoms ==
Typical patients will present with a history of constipation, likely chronic constipation. Patient populations vulnerable to chronic constipation include, but are not limited to, the elderly, persons with dementia, those with damage to the autonomic nervous system, infectious diseases, or intestinal vascular compromise. Some patients, due to their condition, may have limitations in reporting their symptoms. Typical symptoms can include abdominal pain, abdominal distention, abdominal cramping, nausea, vomiting, fever, rectal bleeding, and possible bowel perforation. Patients that develop bowel perforation may present in an acute state with severe abdominal pain and signs of perforation, such as abdominal distention, guarding and rigidity, and air in the abdominal cavity.

=== Complications ===
Stercoral ulcers can lead to a complication known as stercoral colitis. Stercoral colitis is a relatively rare form of inflammatory colitis that can develop as a result of chronic constipation leading to the formation of hardened stool, known as fecaloma. Fecalomas can then lead to distention, possibly causing focal necrosis and possibly ulceration. Additional distention in the area can lead to compromise of the vascular supply, leading to intestinal ischemia This form of colitis can be due to a wide range of etiologies, coinciding with most causes of constipation. Other etiologies range from a stroke, intestinal vascular compromise, or any other damage to the autonomic nervous system to more rare diseases such as Chagas disease and Hirschsprung's disease.

== Diagnosis ==
Ensuring a proper diagnosis involves a variety of tools by the clinician. An efficient abdominal exam, along with a rectal exam aids in diagnosis. Typically patients will have tenderness to palpation on exam. Rebound tenderness or guarding may present with perforation of the ulcer with air leaking into the abdomen. In these patients, their exam may be far more acute with abdominal rigidity and need for immediate surgical intervention. Additionally, a rectal exam may reveal stool present in the rectal vault, pointing to the fact that constipation has been or is still present. These patients may even have blood on their rectal exam, due to passing small amounts of stool around the ulcer and adjacent fecaloma.

Patients may have unstable vital signs if they have been having rectal bleeding, have developed stercoral colitis, and/or have had a perforation of the ulcer. These vital sign changes may be an acute fever, elevated heart rate, and/or decreased blood pressure. Laboratory evaluation may not be as specific in pointing to a diagnosis. Patients may have non-specific leukocytosis with elevated acute phase reactants. However, these are neither specific nor sensitive so the clinician must take into account all aspects of the patient's illness to reach the diagnosis. If a patient presents with severe symptoms it may be useful to order blood cultures and preoperative labs such as type and screen and coagulation testing.

Imaging studies have been shown to be a key aspect in diagnosing patients with stercoral ulcers and stercoral colitis. Patient status on presentation is important to take into consideration when deciding what imaging study to order. Patients who are acutely ill and showing signs of perforation will need an upright Chest x-ray to determine if there is free air in the peritoneum. The imaging study of choice is an CT scan of the abdomen with IV contrast, considering the patient's renal function is adequate. Findings that can be seen are fecal impaction with dilation of the rectosigmoid junction commonly, but any part of the colon can be dilated. Additionally, fecalomas may be seen as masses in the colon. In the case of ulceration, the part of the colon adjacent to the fecaloma will be thickened. This thickening of the bowel will help differentiate from stercoral colitis and stercoral ulcer from fecal impaction as the colon is typically not thickened in cases of fecal impaction.

== Management ==
Treatment of these patients is typically dependent on a case-to-case basis as the overall patient presentation has to be considered. If the patient presents in an acutely ill state with possible sepsis or shock, they will need adequate IV fluid hydration with possible broad-spectrum antibiotics. Additionally, these patients may need surgery if perforation has occurred. Patients without these symptoms should be managed conservatively with either manual or endoscopically guided fecal disimpaction. A bowel regimen should also be started to ensure that bowel movements become normal. Opioid pain medication should be avoided as these medications can slow colonic motility and possibly worsen constipation. The key to management and prognosis is identifying the cause or causes of the underlying constipation. Patients should be encouraged to increase fiber, fluids, and fruits in their habits. Osmotic and stimulant laxatives can also be considered to aid patients if they have trouble making the necessary changes to their diet.
