= Hematochezia =

Bowel movement consisting of fresh blood

- Other names: Haematochezia
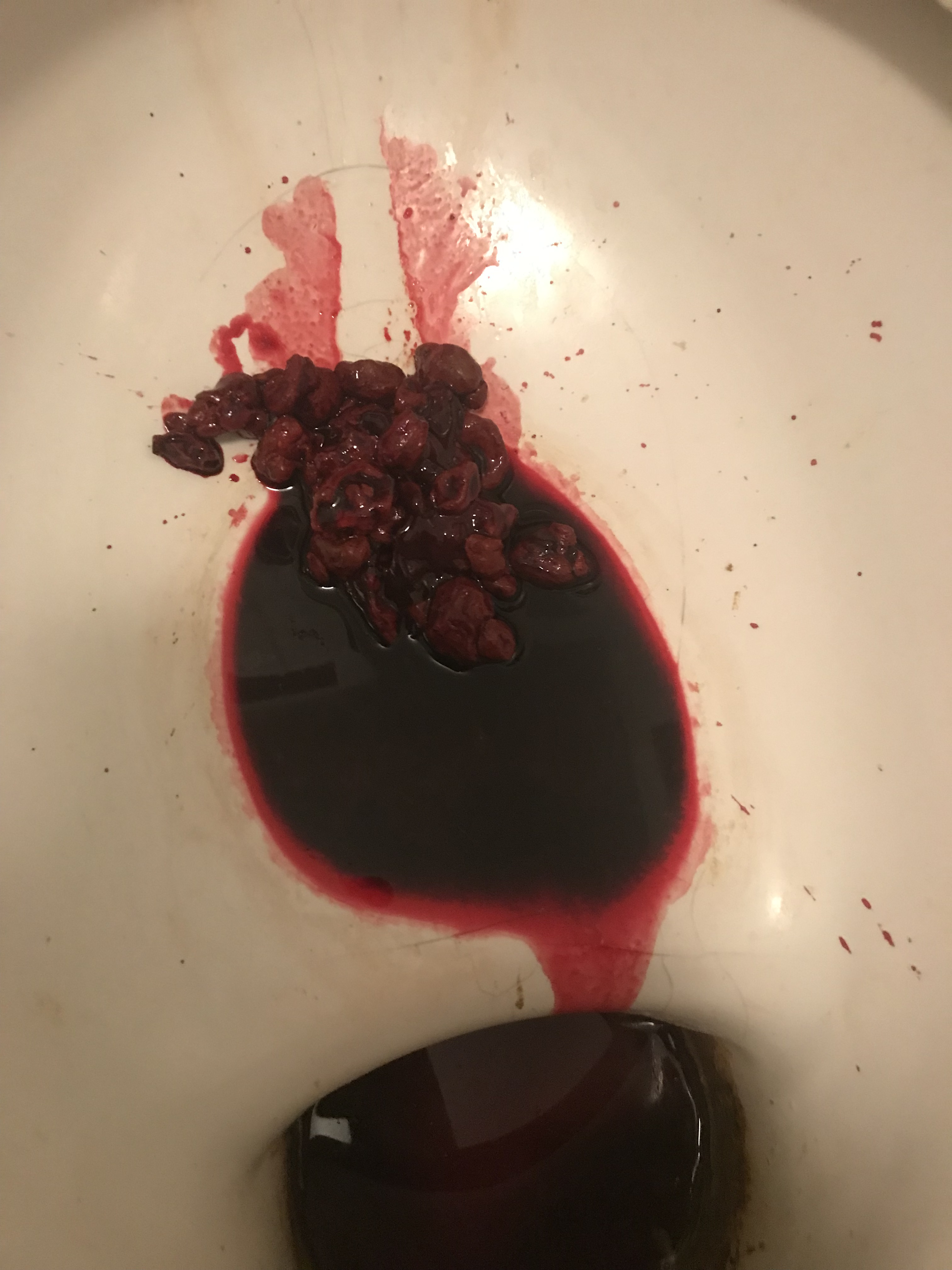
- Bright blood in toilet, December 2021
- Specialty: Gastroenterology
- Symptoms: Bright blood in stool
- Causes: Hemorrhoid, gastritis, gastrointestinal bleeding, stomach cancer

Hematochezia is a form of blood in stool, in which fresh blood passes through the anus while defecating. It differs from melena, which commonly refers to blood in stool originating from upper gastrointestinal bleeding (UGIB). The term derives from Greek αἷμα ("blood") and χέζειν ("to defaecate"). Hematochezia is commonly associated with lower gastrointestinal bleeding, but may also occur from a brisk upper gastrointestinal bleed. The difference between hematochezia and rectorrhagia is that rectal bleeding is not associated with defecation; instead, it is associated with expulsion of fresh bright red blood without stools. The phrase bright red blood per rectum is associated with hematochezia and rectorrhagia.

== Causes ==
In adults, most common causes are hemorrhoids and diverticulosis, both of which are relatively benign; however, it can also be caused by colorectal cancer, which is potentially fatal. In a newborn infant, haematochezia may be the result of swallowed maternal blood at the time of delivery, but can also be an initial symptom of necrotizing enterocolitis, a serious condition affecting premature infants. In babies, hematochezia in conjunction with abdominal pain is associated with intussusception. In adolescents and young adults, inflammatory bowel disease, particularly ulcerative colitis, is a serious cause of hematochezia that must be considered and excluded.

Hematochezia can be due to upper gastrointestinal bleeding. However, as the blood from such a bleed is usually chemically modified by action of acid and enzymes, it presents more commonly as black "tarry" feces known as melena. Haematochezia from an upper gastrointestinal source is an ominous sign, as it suggests a very significant bleed which is more likely to be life-threatening. Eating beetroot can cause harmless red-colored feces (beeturia) because of insufficient metabolism of a red pigment, and is a differential sign that may be mistaken as hematochezia. Consumption of dragon fruit or blackberries may also cause red or black discoloration of the stool and sometimes the urine (pseudohematuria). This too, is a differential sign that is sometimes mistaken for hematochezia.

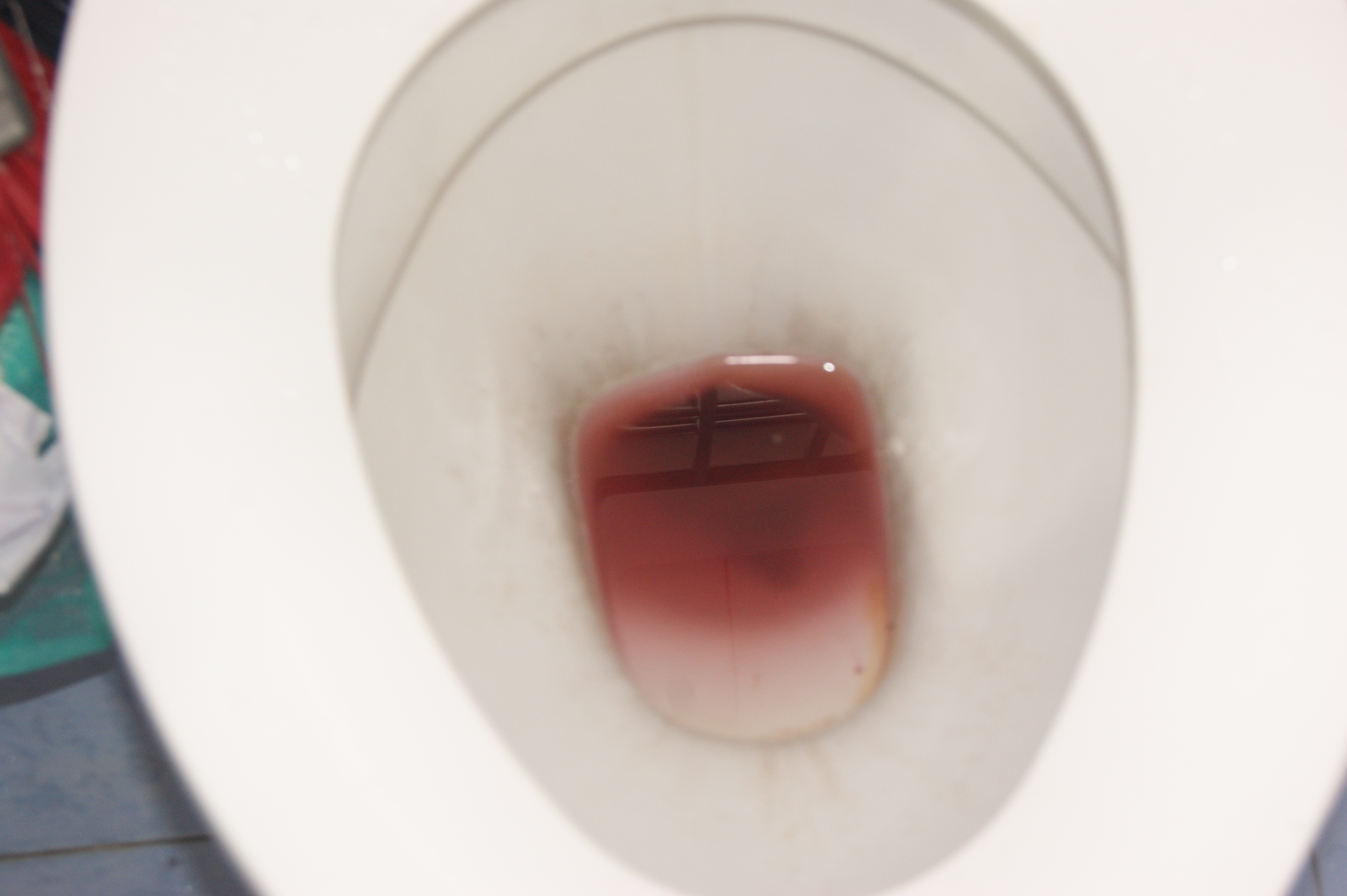
Reddish stool in toilet bowl water due to dragon fruit consumption

In infants, the Apt test can be used to distinguish fetal hemoglobin from maternal blood.

Other common causes of blood in the stool include:

- Colorectal cancer
- Crohn's disease
- Ulcerative colitis
- Other types of inflammatory bowel disease, inflammatory bowel syndrome, or ulceration
- Rectal or anal hemorrhoids or anal fissures, particularly if they rupture or are otherwise irritated
- Shigella or shiga toxin producing E. coli food poisoning
- Necrotizing enterocolitis
- Menstruation
- Dysentery
- Diverticulosis
- Salmonellosis
- Upper gastrointestinal bleeding
- Peptic ulcer disease
- Esophageal varices
- Gastric cancer
- Angiodysplasia
- Intense exercise, especially a high-impact activity like running in hot weather.
- Radiation proctitis

== Diagnosis ==
A complete blood count as well as an hemoglobin test should be performed when a patient presents symptoms of hematochezia. A colonoscopy may be necessary if there is suspicion of bleed from colon particularly in the elderly to look for the site and many causes of bleed like carcinoma, ulcerative colitis, rectal varices or other lesions and in certain instances upper gastrointestinal endoscopy may be required as well to look for any rapid and massive fresh bleed from upper gastrointestinal tract when there may not be sufficient time for the change of colour of blood to occur.

== See also ==
- Blood in stool
