= Angiodysplasia =

Blood vessel malformation in the gut

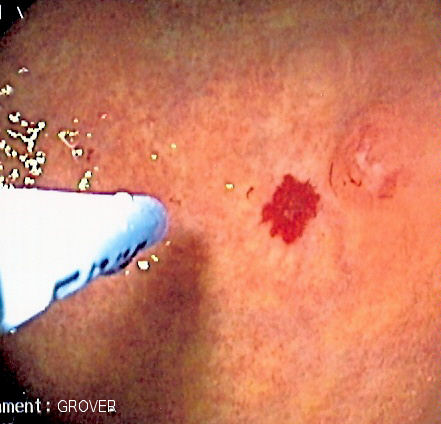
- Endoscopic image of argon plasma coagulation of colonic angiodysplasia.
- Specialty: Angiology

In medicine (gastroenterology), angiodysplasia is a small vascular malformation of the gut. It is a common cause of otherwise unexplained gastrointestinal bleeding and anemia. Lesions are often multiple, and frequently involve the cecum or ascending colon, although they can occur at other places. Treatment may be with colonoscopic interventions, angiography and embolization, medication, or occasionally surgery.

== Signs and symptoms ==
Although some cases present with black, tarry stool (melena), the blood loss can be subtle, with the anemia symptoms predominating.

== Pathophysiology ==
Histologically, it resembles telangiectasia and development is related to age and strain on the bowel wall. It is a degenerative lesion, acquired, probably resulting from chronic and intermittent contraction of the colon that is obstructing the venous drainage of the mucosa. As time goes by the veins become more and more tortuous, while the capillaries of the mucosa gradually dilate and precapillary sphincter becomes incompetent. Thus is formed an arteriovenous malformation characterized by a small tuft of dilated vessels.

Although angiodysplasia is probably quite common, the risk of bleeding is increased in disorders of coagulation. A classic association is Heyde's syndrome (coincidence of aortic valve stenosis and bleeding from angiodysplasia). In this disorder, von Willebrand factor (vWF) is proteolysed due to high shear stress in the highly turbulent blood flow around the aortic valve. vWF is most active in vascular beds with high shear stress, including angiodysplasias, and deficiency of vWF increases the bleeding risk from such lesions.

Warkentin et al. argue that apart from aortic valve stenosis, some other conditions that feature high shear stress might also increase the risk of bleeding from angiodysplasia.

== Diagnosis ==
Fecal occult blood testing is positive when bleeding is active. If bleeding is intermittent the test may be negative at times.

Diagnosis of angiodysplasia is often accomplished with endoscopy, either colonoscopy or esophagogastroduodenoscopy (EGD). Although the lesions can be notoriously hard to find, the patient usually is diagnosed by endoscopy. A new technique, pill enteroscopy, has been a major advance in diagnosis, especially in the small bowel which is difficult to reach with traditional endoscopy. With this technique a pill that contains a video camera and radio transmitter is swallowed, and pictures of the small intestine are sent to a receiver worn by the patient. Recently, multiphase CT angiography (without positive oral contrast) has been shown to play a promising role in the diagnoses of small and large bowel angiodysplasia, especially when associated with active hemorrhage.

Angiodysplasiae in the small bowel can also be diagnosed and treated with double-balloon enteroscopy, a technique involving a long endoscopic camera and overtube, both fitted with balloons, that allow the bowel to be accordioned over the camera.

In cases with negative endoscopic findings and high clinical suspicion, selective angiography of the mesenteric arteries is sometimes necessary, but this allows for interventions at time of the procedure. An alternative is scintigraphy with red blood cells labeled with a radioactive marker; this shows the site of the bleeding on a gamma camera but tends to be unhelpful unless the bleeding is continuous and significant.

== Treatment ==
If the anemia is severe, blood transfusion is required before any other intervention is considered. Endoscopic treatment is an initial possibility, where cautery or argon plasma coagulation (APC) treatment is applied through the endoscope. Failing this, angiography and embolization with particles is another microinvasive treatment option, which avoids the need for surgery and bowel resection. Here, the vessel supplying the angiodysplasia is selectively catheterized and embolized with microparticles. Resection of the affected part of the bowel may be needed if the other modalities fail. However, the lesions may be widespread, making such treatment impractical.

If the bleeding is from multiple or inaccessible sites, systemic therapy with medication may be necessary. First-line options include the antifibrinolytics tranexamic acid or aminocaproic acid. Estrogens can be used to stop bleeding from angiodysplasia. Estrogens cause mild hypercoagulability of the blood. Estrogen side effects can be dangerous and unpleasant in both sexes. Changes in voice and breast swelling is bothersome in men, but older women often report improvement of libido and perimenopausal symptoms. (The worries about hormone replacement therapy/HRT, however, apply here as well.)

In difficult cases, there have been positive reports about octreotide and thalidomide.

In severe cases or cases not responsive to either endoscopic or medical treatment, surgery may be necessary to arrest the bleeding.
