= Gastrointestinal bleeding =

Bleeding in the gastrointestinal tract

- Other names: Gastrointestinal hemorrhage, GI bleed
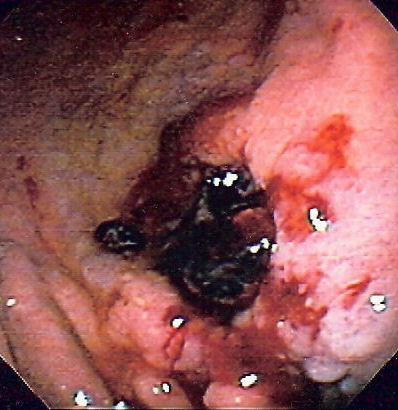
- Endoscopic image of gastric MALT lymphoma taken in antrum of stomach in patient who presented with upper GI hemorrhage. Appearance is similar to gastric ulcer with adherent blood clot. Pathology was consistent with gastric lymphoma.
- Specialty: Gastroenterology, emergency medicine
- Symptoms: Vomiting red blood, vomiting black blood, bloody stool, black stool, fatigue
- Complications: Iron-deficiency anemia, heart-related chest pain
- Types: Upper gastrointestinal bleeding, lower gastrointestinal bleeding
- Causes: Upper: peptic ulcer disease, esophageal varices due to liver cirrhosis, cancer Lower: hemorrhoids, cancer, inflammatory bowel disease
- Diagnostic method: Medical history and physical examination, blood tests
- Treatment: Intravenous fluids, blood transfusions, endoscopy, angiographic embolization
- Medication: Proton pump inhibitors, octreotide, antibiotics
- Prognosis: ~15% risk of death
- Frequency: Upper: 100 per 100,000 adults per year Lower: 25 per 100,000 per year

Gastrointestinal bleeding (GI bleed), also called gastrointestinal hemorrhage (GIB), is all forms of bleeding in the gastrointestinal tract, from the mouth to the rectum. When there is significant blood loss over a short time, symptoms may include vomiting red blood, vomiting black blood, bloody stool, or black stool. Small amounts of bleeding over a long time may cause iron-deficiency anemia resulting in feeling tired or heart-related chest pain. Other symptoms may include abdominal pain, shortness of breath, pale skin, or passing out. Sometimes in those with small amounts of bleeding no symptoms may be present.

Bleeding is typically divided into two main types: upper gastrointestinal bleeding and lower gastrointestinal bleeding. Causes of upper GI bleeds include: peptic ulcer disease, esophageal varices due to liver cirrhosis and cancer, among others. Causes of lower GI bleeds include: hemorrhoids, cancer, and inflammatory bowel disease among others. Small amounts of bleeding may be detected by fecal occult blood test. Endoscopy of the lower and upper gastrointestinal tract may locate the area of bleeding. Medical imaging may be useful in cases that are not clear. Bleeding may also be diagnosed and treated during minimally invasive angiography procedures such as hemorrhoidal artery embolization.

Initial treatment focuses on resuscitation which may include intravenous fluids and blood transfusions. Often blood transfusions are not recommended unless the hemoglobin is less than 70 or 80 g/L. Treatment with proton pump inhibitors, octreotide, and antibiotics may be considered in certain cases. If other measures are not effective, an esophageal balloon may be attempted in those with presumed esophageal varices. Endoscopy of the esophagus, stomach, and duodenum or endoscopy of the large bowel are generally recommended within 24 hours and may allow treatment as well as diagnosis.

An upper GI bleed is more common than lower GI bleed. An upper GI bleed occurs in 50 to 150 per 100,000 adults per year. A lower GI bleed is estimated to occur in 20 to 30 per 100,000 per year. It results in about 300,000 hospital admissions a year in the United States. Risk of death from a GI bleed is between 5% and 30%. Risk of bleeding is more common in males and increases with age.

== Classification ==
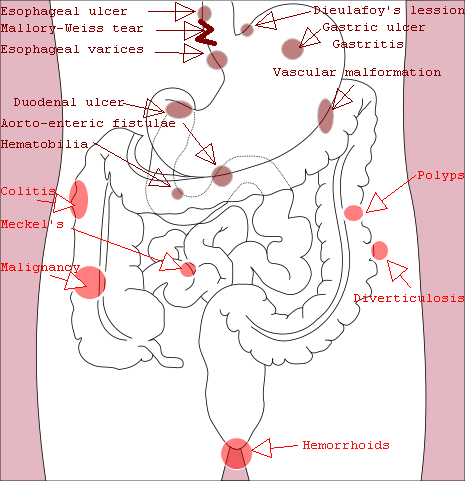
Causes of gastrointestinal bleeding

Gastrointestinal bleeding can be roughly divided into two clinical syndromes: upper gastrointestinal bleeding and lower gastrointestinal bleeding. About 2/3 of all GI bleeds are from upper sources and 1/3 from lower sources. Common causes of gastrointestinal bleeding include infections, cancers, vascular disorders, adverse effects of medications, and blood clotting disorders. Obscure gastrointestinal bleeding (OGIB) is when a source is unclear following investigation.

=== Upper gastrointestinal ===
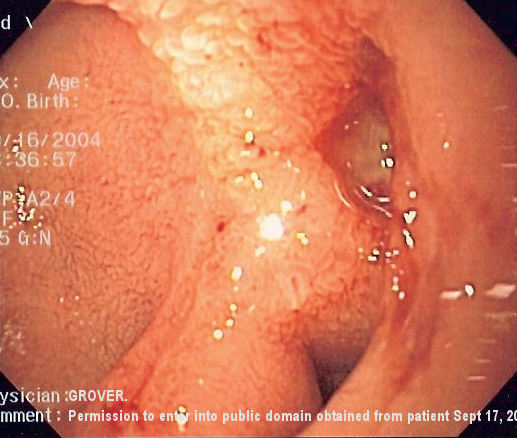
Endoscopic image of a posterior wall duodenal ulcer with a clean base, which is a common cause of upper gastrointestinal hemorrhage.

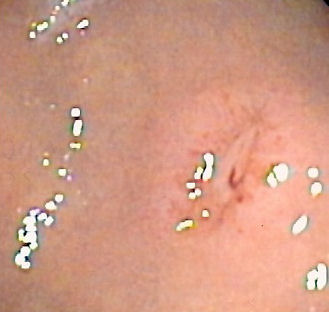
Endoscopic image of small gastric ulcer with visible blood vessels, a potential warning sign for upper gastrointestinal bleeding

Upper gastrointestinal bleeding is from a source between the pharynx and the ligament of Treitz. An upper source is characterised by hematemesis (vomiting up blood) and melena (tarry stool containing altered blood). About half of cases are due to peptic ulcer disease (gastric or duodenal ulcers). Esophageal inflammation and erosive disease are the next most common causes. In those with liver cirrhosis, 50–60% of bleeding is due to esophageal varices. Approximately half of those with peptic ulcers have an H. pylori infection. Other causes include Mallory-Weiss tears, cancer, and angiodysplasia.

A number of medications are found to cause upper GI bleeds. NSAIDs or COX-2 inhibitors increase the risk about fourfold. SSRIs, corticosteroids, and anticoagulants may also increase the risk. The risk with dabigatran is 30% greater than that with warfarin.

=== Lower gastrointestinal ===
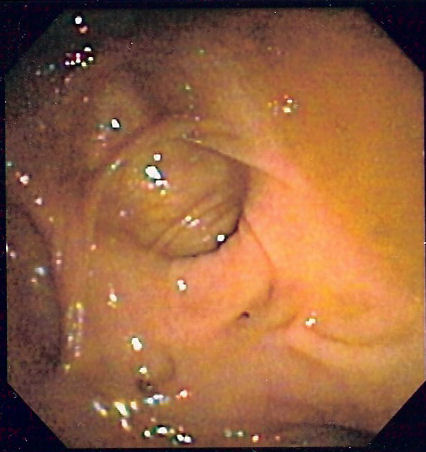
Diverticular disease can potentially cause lower gastrointestinal bleeding

Lower gastrointestinal bleeding is typically from the colon, rectum or anus. Common causes of lower gastrointestinal bleeding include hemorrhoids, cancer, angiodysplasia, ulcerative colitis, Crohn's disease, and aortoenteric fistula. It may be indicated by the passage of fresh red blood rectally, especially in the absence of bloody vomiting. Lower gastrointestinal bleeding could also lead to melena if the bleeding occurs in the small intestine or proximal colon.

== Signs and symptoms ==
Gastrointestinal bleeding can range from small non-visible amounts, which are only detected by laboratory testing, to massive bleeding where bright red blood is passed and shock develops. Rapid bleeding may cause syncope. The presence of bright red blood in stool, known as hematochezia, typically indicates lower gastrointestinal bleeding. Digested blood from the upper gastrointestinal tract may appear black rather than red, resulting in "coffee ground" vomit or melena. Other signs and symptoms include feeling tired, dizziness, and pale skin color.

A number of foods and medications can turn the stool either red or black in the absence of bleeding. Bismuth found in many antacids may turn stools black as may activated charcoal. Blood from the vagina or urinary tract may also be confused with blood in the stool.

== Diagnosis ==
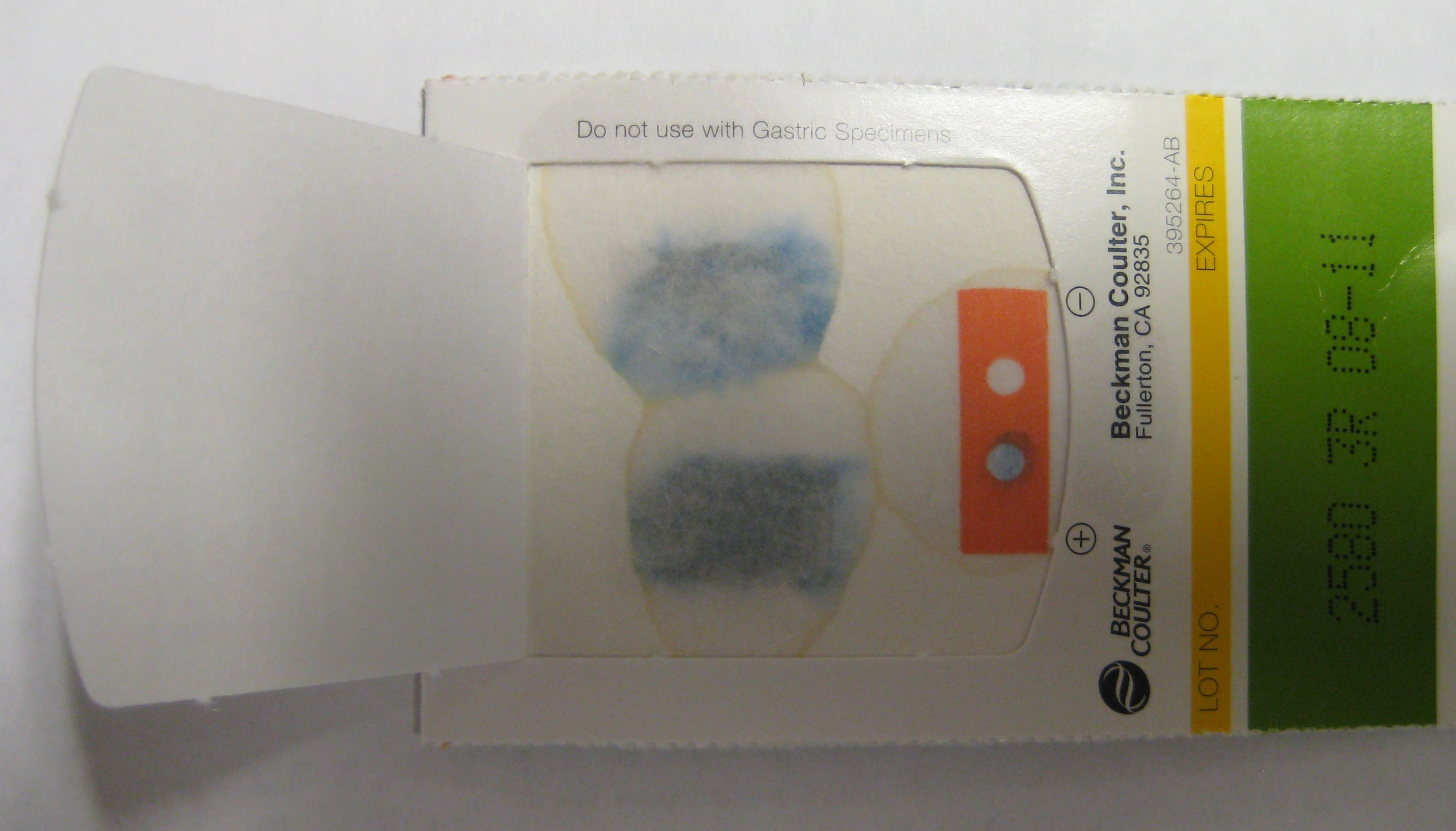
A positive fecal occult blood test

Diagnosis is often based on direct observation of blood in the stool or vomit. Although fecal occult blood testing has been used in an emergency setting, this use is not recommended as the test has only been validated for colon cancer screening. Differentiating between upper and lower bleeding in some cases can be difficult. The severity of an upper GI bleed can be judged based on the Blatchford score or Rockall score. The Rockall score is the more accurate of the two. As of 2008 there is no scoring system useful for lower GI bleeds.

=== Clinical ===
Gastric aspiration and or lavage, where a tube is inserted into the stomach via the nose in an attempt to determine if there is blood in the stomach, if negative does not rule out an upper GI bleed but if positive is useful for ruling one in. Clots in the stool indicate a lower GI source while melana stools an upper one.

=== Laboratory testing ===
Recommended laboratory blood testing includes: cross-matching blood, hemoglobin, hematocrit, platelets, coagulation time, and electrolytes. If the ratio of blood urea nitrogen to creatinine is greater than 30 the source is more likely from the upper GI tract.

=== Imaging ===
A CT angiography is useful for determining the exact location of the bleeding within the gastrointestinal tract. Nuclear scintigraphy is a sensitive test for detecting occult gastrointestinal bleeding when direct imaging with upper and lower endoscopies are negative. Direct angiography allows for embolization of a bleeding source, but requires a bleeding rate faster than 1mL/minute.

== Prevention ==
In patients with significant varices or cirrhosis nonselective β-blockers reduce the risk of future bleeding. With a target heart rate of 55 beats per minute B-blockers reduce the absolute risk of bleeding by 10%. Endoscopic band ligation (EBL) is also effective at improving outcomes. Either B-blockers or EBL is recommended as initial preventative measures. In patients who have had a previous variceal bleed both treatments are recommended. Some evidence supports the addition of isosorbide mononitrate. Testing for and treating those who are positive for H. pylori is recommended. Transjugular intrahepatic portosystemic shunting (TIPS) may be used to prevent bleeding in people who re-bleed despite other measures.

Among patients admitted to the ICU with high risk of bleeding, a PPI or H2RA appears useful.

== Treatment ==
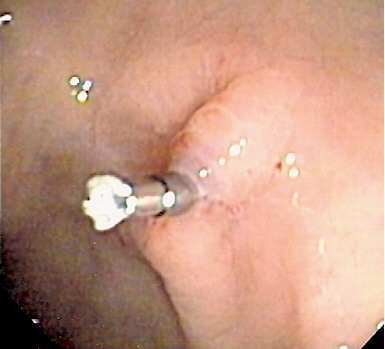
Endoscopic clipping placed on a gastric ulcer at risk for bleeding

The initial focus is on resuscitation beginning with airway management and fluid resuscitation using either intravenous fluids and or blood. A number of medications may improve outcomes depending on the source of the bleeding.

=== Peptic ulcers ===
Based on evidence from people with other health problems crystalloid and colloids are believed to be equivalent for peptic ulcer bleeding. Proton pump inhibitor (PPI) treatment before endoscopy may decrease the need for endoscopic hemostatic treatment, however it is not clear if this treatment reduces mortality, the risk of re-bleeding, or the and the need for surgery. Oral and intravenous formulations may be equivalent; however, the evidence to support this is suboptimal. In those with less severe disease and where endoscopy is rapidly available, they are of less immediate clinical importance. There is tentative evidence of benefit for tranexamic acid which inhibits clot breakdown. Somatostatin and octreotide, while recommended for varicial bleeding, have not been found to be of general use for non variceal bleeds. After treatment of a high risk bleeding ulcer endoscopically giving a PPI once or a day rather than as an infusion appears to work just as well and is less expensive (the method may be either by mouth or intravenously).

=== Variceal bleeding ===
For initial fluid replacement, colloids or albumin is preferred in people with cirrhosis. Medications typically include octreotide or, if not available, vasopressin and nitroglycerin to reduce portal venous pressures. Terlipressin appears to be more effective than octreotide, but it is not available in many areas of the world. It is the only medication that has been shown to reduce mortality in acute variceal bleeding. This is in addition to endoscopic banding or sclerotherapy for the varices. If this is sufficient then beta blockers and nitrates may be used for the prevention of re-bleeding. If bleeding continues, balloon tamponade with a Sengstaken-Blakemore tube or Minnesota tube may be used in an attempt to mechanically compress the varices. This may then be followed by a transjugular intrahepatic portosystemic shunt. In those with cirrhosis, antibiotics decrease the chance of bleeding again, shorten the length of time spent in hospital, and decrease mortality. Octreotide reduces the need for blood transfusions and may decrease mortality. No trials of vitamin K have been conducted.

=== Blood products ===
The evidence for benefit of blood transfusions in GI bleed is poor with some evidence finding harm. In those in shock O-negative packed red blood cells are recommended. If large amounts of pack red blood cells are used additional platelets and fresh frozen plasma (FFP) should be administered to prevent coagulopathies. In alcoholics FFP is suggested before confirmation of a coagulopathy due to presumed blood clotting problems. Evidence supports holding off on blood transfusions in those who have a hemoglobin greater than 7 to 8 g/dL and moderate bleeding, including in those with preexisting coronary artery disease.

If the INR is greater than 1.5 to 1.8 correction with fresh frozen plasma or prothrombin complex may decrease mortality. Evidence of a harm or benefit of recombinant activated factor VII in those with liver diseases and gastrointestinal bleeding is not determined. A massive transfusion protocol may be used, but there is a lack of evidence for this indication.

=== Procedures ===
The Blakemore esophageal balloon used for stopping esophageal bleeds if other measures have failed

The benefits versus risks of placing a nasogastric tube in those with upper GI bleeding are not determined. Endoscopic evaluation within 24 hours is recommended, in addition to medical management. A number of endoscopic treatments may be used, including: epinephrine injection, band ligation, sclerotherapy, and fibrin glue depending on what is found. Prokinetic agents such as erythromycin before endoscopy can decrease the amount of blood in the stomach and thus improve the operators view. They also decrease the amount of blood transfusions required. Early endoscopy decreases hospital and the amount of blood transfusions needed. A second endoscopy within a day is routinely recommended by some but by others only in specific situations. Proton pump inhibitors, if they have not been started earlier, are recommended in those in whom high risk signs for bleeding are found. High and low dose PPIs appear equivalent at this point. It is also recommended that people with high risk signs are kept in hospital for at least 72 hours. Those at low risk of re-bleeding may begin eating typically 24 hours following endoscopy. If other measures fail or are not available, esophageal balloon tamponade may be attempted. While there is a success rate up to 90%, there are some potentially significant complications including aspiration and esophageal perforation.

Colonoscopy is useful for the diagnosis and treatment of lower GI bleeding. A number of techniques may be employed including clipping, cauterizing, and sclerotherapy. Preparation for colonoscopy takes a minimum of six hours which in those bleeding briskly may limit its applicability. Surgery, while rarely used to treat upper GI bleeds, is still commonly used to manage lower GI bleeds by cutting out the part of the intestines that is causing the problem. Angiographic embolization may be used for both upper and lower GI bleeds. Transjugular intrahepatic portosystemic shunting (TIPS) may also be considered.

== Prognosis ==
Death in those with a GI bleed is more commonly due to other illnesses (some of which may have contributed to the bleed, such as cancer or cirrhosis) than the bleeding itself. Of those admitted to a hospital because of a GI bleed, death occurs in about 7%. Despite treatment, re-bleeding occurs in about 7–16% of those with upper GI bleeding. In those with esophageal varices, bleeding occurs in about 5–15% a year and if they have bled once, there is a higher risk of further bleeding within six weeks. Testing and treating H. pylori if found can prevent re-bleeding in those with peptic ulcers. The benefits versus risks of restarting blood thinners such as aspirin or warfarin and anti-inflammatories such as NSAIDs need to be carefully considered. If aspirin is needed for cardiovascular disease prevention, it is reasonable to restart it within seven days in combination with a PPI for those with nonvariceal upper GI bleeding.

== Epidemiology ==
Gastrointestinal bleeding from the upper tract occurs in 50 to 150 per 100,000 adults per year. It is more common than lower gastrointestinal bleeding which is estimated to occur at the rate of 20 to 30 per 100,000 per year. Risk of bleeding is more common in males and increases with age.
