= Anal fissure =

Break or tear in anal canal skin

- Other names: Fissure in ano, rectal fissure
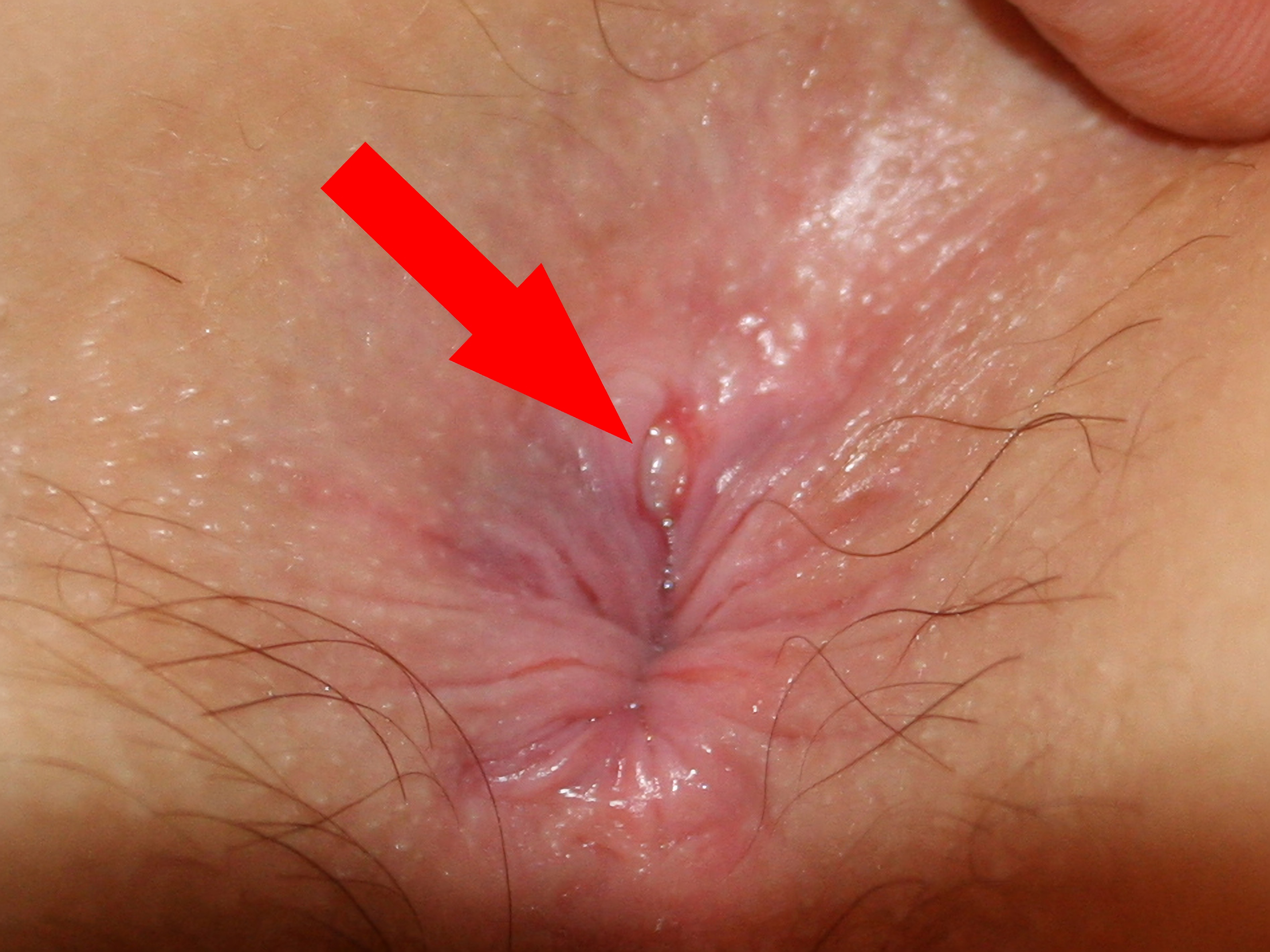
- An anal fissure
- Specialty: Gastroenterology

An anal fissure is a break or tear in the skin of the anal canal. Symptoms associated with acute fissures include pain with defecation, anal spasm, and bleeding with defecation. Fissures persisting for longer than 4 weeks, or recurrent fissures, are defined as chronic. Anal fissure is a common condition although published epidemiological data are limited. Half of patients with fissures heal with nonoperative management. Surgical treatment, if required, has a high success rate.

== Causes ==
Although the exact cause of anal fissure is unknown, most anal fissures are thought to be due to trauma to the anal mucus membrane most commonly from the passage of large, hard stools, or repeated irritation from chronic diarrhea.

Most anal fissures are in the midline. If they occur off the midline, they warrant evaluation for an underlying diagnosis such as Crohn's disease, HIV/AIDS, and associated secondary infections, ulcerative colitis, tuberculosis, syphilis, leukemia, or cancer.

Non-healing or recurrent anal fissures are considered chronic. The most common cause of impaired healing is spasming of the internal anal sphincter muscle. The high anal pressure resulting from spasm can impair blood supply to the anal mucosa, resulting in a non-healing ulcer.

== Diagnosis ==
The diagnosis of anal fissure is made by history and physical examination. Anal fissure is a common condition and the main symptoms include anal pain and bleeding. The pain is often severe and typically occurs during and after defecation; chronic fissures can cause pain that lasts many hours after a bowel movement.

Suspected diagnosis of an anal fissure is confirmed by physical examination with visual examination of a split or tear of the skin at or just inside the anus. Associated findings include a sentinel skin tag and hypertrophied anal papilla.

Anal fissures cannot be visualized with end-viewing endoscopes. In addition, instrumentation of the anal canal is traumatic and only rarely gives diagnostic information. When severe anal pain cannot be diagnosed comfortably, examination under anesthesia is recommended.

== Prevention ==
Preventative measures for anal fissure include avoidance of straining during defecation, high fiber diet, and adequate fluid intake. Treatment of constipation and diarrhea as well as any underlying associated medical conditions is recommended.

== Treatment ==
About half of all fissures heal with conservative care, which includes fiber supplementation, increased fluid intake, sitz baths, and topical analgesics. Conservative care alone is appropriate for most acute fissures. For chronic or recurrent fissures, topical therapy, botulinum toxin injection, and surgery are available.

=== Topical Therapy ===
Topical therapy for anal fissures is directed at relaxing the anal sphincter allowing for increased blood flow and fissure healing. After conservative care, topical therapy is recommended as a first-line treatment. Topical therapy includes nitroglycerin ointment and diltiazem (calcium channel blocker) ointment. Nitroglycerin has the side effect of headache, making diltazem ointment the preferred topical agent.

=== Botulinum Toxin Injection ===
Direct injection of botulinum toxin (Botox) into the anal sphincter to relax it is a nonsurgical procedure used to promote anal fissure healing. Botulinum toxin injection has similar fissure healing results compared to topical therapies although comparisons are difficult given the wide variety of dosing protocols used in studies. Combination therapy of botulinum toxin injection and topical therapy has been suggested to improve healing and symptoms in patients with chronic anal fissure. Overall, botulinum toxin injection has similar results compared with topical therapies as first-line therapy for chronic anal fissures and modest improvement in healing rates as second-line therapy following failed treatment with topical therapies.

=== Surgery ===
==== Lateral internal sphincterotomy ====
Lateral internal sphincterotomy (LIS) is the surgical treatment of choice for chronic anal fissure in patients without preoperative fecal incontinence. The procedure involves an incision into the anal spincter muscules. Cutting the muscle reduces spasm and lowers resting pressure which improves blood supply to the affected area and promotes healing. LIS has superior healing rates in comparison to topical therapy or botulinum toxin, with success rates of 88-100% and is the most effective surgical procedure in patients without preoperative gas or stool incontinence.

Fecal incontinence is a known complication of LIS with as many as 39% of patients experiencing temporary incontinence after LIS. These symptoms typically resolve within 6-8 weeks.

Groups with increased risk for postoperative incontinence include women with prior vaginal delivery and those with prior ano-rectal surgery.

Long term incontinence rates in a large retrospective study (which excluded higher risk patients) showed about 25% of patients had some degree of postoperative incontinence long term. The majority of these patients had incontinence for gas only. About 2% had liquid stool incontinence, and no patient had incontinence for solid stool. No patient required constipating medications in their lifestyle and only one patient (1%) required pads.

Newer surgical techniques have lowered the incidence of postoperative incontinence. "Tailored" sphincterotomy which reduces the extent of the incision has been found to have the same efficacy as conventional LIS with reduced fecal incontinence.

==== Anocutaneous Flap ====
For patients with chronic anal fissure who are at higher risk for fecal incontinence after LIS, an anocutaneous flap can be used. This sphincter preserving procedure has been associated with good fissure healing rates and low rates of fecal incontinence. The American Society of Colon & Rectal surgeons recommends further trials to better define the role of this procedure in the treatment of anal fissures.

==== Fissurectomy ====
Fissurectomy involves excision of the skin on and around the anal fissure and excision of the sentinel skin tag if one is present. Fissurectomy both with and without anal advancement flap has been reported to have good healing results and reduced fecal incontinence.

== See also ==
- Anal fistula
- Hemorrhoid
- Pruritus ani
