= Sigmoidoscopy =

Medical examination of the large intestine from the rectum to the sigmoid colon

- ICD-10-PCS: 0DBN8ZX (with biopsy)
- MeSH: D012812
- OPS-301 code: 1-651
- MedlinePlus: 003885

Sigmoidoscopy ("sigma", the Greek term for letter "s/ς" + "eidos" + "scopy": namely, to look inside an "s"/"ς"-like object) is the minimally invasive medical examination of the large intestine from the rectum through to the nearest part of the colon, the sigmoid colon. There are two types of sigmoidoscopy: flexible sigmoidoscopy, which uses a flexible endoscope, and rigid sigmoidoscopy, which uses a rigid device. Flexible sigmoidoscopy is generally the preferred procedure. A sigmoidoscopy is similar to, but not the same as, a colonoscopy. A sigmoidoscopy only examines up to the sigmoid, the most distal part of the colon, while colonoscopy examines the whole large bowel.

== Flexible sigmoidoscopy ==
Flexible sigmoidoscopy enables the physician to look at the inside of the large intestine from the rectum to the left side of the colon, called the sigmoid. Physicians may use the procedure to find the cause of diarrhea, abdominal pain, or constipation. They also use it to look for benign and malignant polyps, as well as early signs of cancer in the descending colon and rectum. With flexible sigmoidoscopy, the physician can see intestinal bleeding, inflammation, abnormal growths, and ulcers in the descending colon and rectum. Flexible sigmoidoscopy is not sufficient to detect polyps or cancer in the ascending or transverse colon (two-thirds of the colon). However, although in absolute terms only a relatively small section of the large intestine can be examined using sigmoidoscopy, the sites which can be observed represent areas which are most frequently affected by diseases such as colorectal cancer, for example the rectum.

For the procedure, the patient must lie on their side on the examining table. The physician inserts a short, flexible, lit tube into the rectum and slowly guides it into the colon. The tube is called a sigmoidoscope. The scope transmits an image of the inside of the rectum and colon, so the physician can carefully examine the lining of these organs. The scope also blows air into these organs, which inflates them in order to help the physician see better.

If anything unusual is in the rectum or colon, like a polyp or inflamed tissue, the physician can remove a piece of it using instruments inserted into the scope. The physician will send that piece of tissue (biopsy) to the lab for testing.

Bleeding and puncture of the colon are possible complications of sigmoidoscopy. However, such complications are uncommon.

Flexible sigmoidoscopy takes 10 to 20 minutes. During the procedure, the patient might feel pressure and slight cramping in the lower abdomen, but the patient will feel better afterward when the air leaves the colon.

== Preparation ==
The colon and rectum must be completely empty for flexible sigmoidoscopy to be thorough and safe, thus the patient must drink only clear liquids for 12 to 24 hours beforehand. This includes bouillon or broth, gelatin, strained fruit juice, water, plain coffee, plain tea, or diet soft drinks.

The night before or right before the procedure, the patient receives a laxative (e.g. macrogol, lactulose etc.) and/or an enema, which is a liquid solution that washes out the intestines. No sedation is required during this procedure as long as the examination does not exceed the level of the splenic flexure.

== Rigid sigmoidoscopy ==
Rigid sigmoidoscopy may be useful in ano-rectal diseases such as bleeding per rectum or inflammatory rectal disease, particularly in the general practice and pediatrics.

For performing the examination, the patient must lie on the left side, in the so-called Sims' position. The bowels are previously emptied with a suppository, and a digital rectal examination is first performed. The sigmoidoscope is lubricated and inserted with obturator in general direction of the navel. The direction is then changed and the obturator is removed so that the physician may penetrate further with direct vision. A bellows is used to insufflate air to distend the rectum. Lateral movements of the sigmoidoscope's tip negotiate the Houston valve and the recto-sigmoid junction.

== Benefits ==
Several studies have shown the potential benefits of sigmoidoscopy in detecting colorectal cancer.

In a 2009 Norwegian study, results were somewhat inconclusive at seven years.

We found a trend towards reduced mortality from colorectal cancer for both total colorectal cancer mortality (27% reduction) and rectosigmoidal cancer mortality (37%), but this was not statistically significant in intention to screen analysis. Corresponding reductions in mortality among attenders (that is, the people actually screened, instead of just the ones in the group to be screened—this data set may include selection bias) were 59% and 76%, both statistically significant compared with the control group[.]

The study saw no detectable difference in all-cause mortality.

A 2010 British study showed sigmoidoscopy reduced "overall colorectal cancer incidence and mortality by 31 percent", and "incidence of cancer in just the lower part of the colon (or distal colon) was reduced by approximately 50 percent for those who underwent screening compared with those in the control group." Overall colon-cancer mortality was reduced by 43% (thus preventing one cancer per 200 screenings, and one cancer death per 500 screenings). The study also showed that the effect was persistent—a single sigmoidoscopy reduced cancer rates for the length of the 11-year study.

== Risks ==
Although generally considered quite safe, sigmoidoscopy does carry the very rare possibility of tearing of the intestinal wall by the instrument, which could require immediate surgery to repair the tear; in addition, removal of a polyp may sometimes lead to localized bleeding which is resistant to cauterization by the instrument and must be stopped by surgical intervention.

== See also ==
- Colonoscopy
