= Melena =

Medical condition with dark feces

- Other names: Melaena, melæna
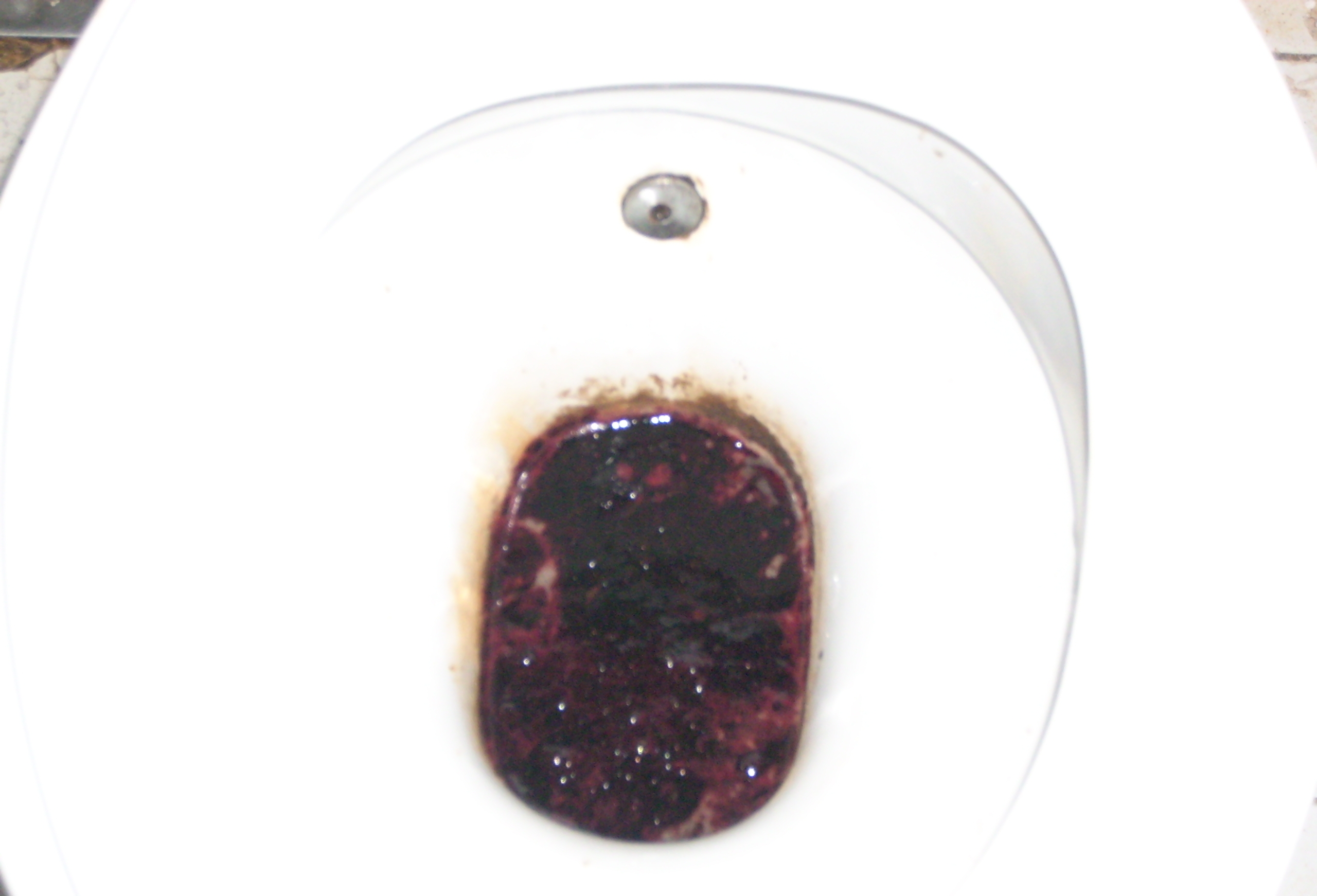
- Black blood in stool, sign of melena, 2008
- Pronunciation: /məˈliːnə/ or /ˈmɛlɪnə/
- Specialty: General surgery, gastroenterology
- Symptoms: Dark blood in stool
- Causes: Gastritis; Gastrointestinal bleeding; Stomach cancer

Melena is a form of blood in stool which refers to the dark black, tarry feces that are commonly associated with upper gastrointestinal bleeding. The black color and characteristic strong odor are caused by hemoglobin in the blood being altered by digestive enzymes and intestinal bacteria.

Iron supplements may cause a grayish-black stool that should be distinguished from melena, as should black coloration caused by a number of medications, such as bismuth subsalicylate (the active ingredient in Pepto-Bismol), or by foods such as beetroot, black liquorice, or blueberries.

== Causes ==
The most common cause of melena is peptic ulcer disease. However, any bleeding within the upper gastrointestinal tract or the ascending colon can lead to melena. Melena may also be a complication of anticoagulant medications, such as warfarin.

Causes of upper gastrointestinal bleeding that may result in melena include malignant tumors affecting the esophagus, stomach or small intestine, hemorrhagic blood diseases, such as thrombocytopenia and hemophilia, gastritis, stomach cancer, esophageal varices, Meckel's diverticulum and Mallory-Weiss syndrome.

Causes of "false" melena include iron supplements, Pepto-Bismol, Maalox, and lead, blood swallowed as a result of a nose bleed (epistaxis), and blood ingested as part of the diet, as with consumption of black pudding (blood sausage), or with the traditional African Maasai diet, which includes much blood drained from cattle.

Melena is considered a medical emergency as it arises from a significant amount of bleeding. Urgent care is required to rule out serious causes and prevent potentially life-threatening emergencies.

A less serious, self-limiting case of melena can occur in newborns two to three days after delivery, due to swallowed maternal blood.

== Diagnosis ==
In acute cases, with a large amount of blood loss, patients may present with anemia or low blood pressure. However, aside from the melena itself, many patients may present with few symptoms. Often, the first approach is to use endoscopy to look for obvious signs of a bleed. In cases where the source of the bleed is unclear, but melena is present, an upper endoscopy is recommended, to try to ascertain the source of the bleed.

Lower gastrointestinal bleeding sources usually present with hematochezia or frank blood. A test with poor sensitivity/specificity that may detect the source of bleeding is the tagged red blood cell scan. This is especially used for slow bleeding (<0.5 ml/min). However, for rapid bleeding (>0.5 ml/min), mesenteric angiogram ± embolization is the gold standard. Colonoscopy is often first line, however.

=== Melena versus hematochezia ===
Bleeds that originate from the lower gastrointestinal tract (such as the sigmoid colon and rectum) are generally associated with the passage of bright red blood, or hematochezia, particularly when brisk. Only blood that originates from a more proximal source (such as the small intestine), or bleeding from a lower source that occurs slowly enough to allow for enzymatic breakdown, is associated with melena. For this reason, melena is often associated with blood in the stomach or duodenum (upper gastrointestinal bleeding), for example by a peptic ulcer. A rough estimate is that it takes about 14 hours for blood to be broken down within the intestinal lumen; therefore if transit time is less than 14 hours the patient will have hematochezia, and if greater than 14 hours the patient will exhibit melena. One often-stated rule of thumb is that melena only occurs if the source of bleeding is above the ligament of Treitz although, as noted below, exceptions occur with enough frequency to render it unreliable.

== Etymology ==
The origin of melena is dated to the early 19th century via modern Latin, via Greek melaina (feminine of melas, black).

== See also ==
- Blood in stool
- Dieulafoy's lesion
- Hematemesis
