= Diverticulosis =

Condition of the wall of the intestine

- Diverticulosis as seen endoscopically
- Specialty: General surgery

Diverticulosis is the condition of having multiple pouches (diverticula) in the colon that are not inflamed. These are outpockets of the colonic mucosa and submucosa through weaknesses of muscle layers in the colon wall. Diverticula do not cause symptoms in most people. Diverticular disease occurs when diverticula become clinically inflamed, a condition known as diverticulitis.

Diverticula typically occur in the sigmoid colon, which is commonplace for increased pressure. The left side of the colon is more commonly affected in the United States while the right side is more commonly affected in Asia. Diagnosis is often during routine colonoscopy or as an incidental finding during CT scan.

It is common in Western countries with about half of those over the age of 60 affected in Canada and the United States. Diverticula are uncommon before the age of 40, and increase in incidence beyond that age. Rates are lower in Africa; the reasons for this remain unclear but may involve the greater prevalence of a high fiber diet in contrast with the lower-fiber diet characteristic of many Western populations.

== Signs and symptoms ==
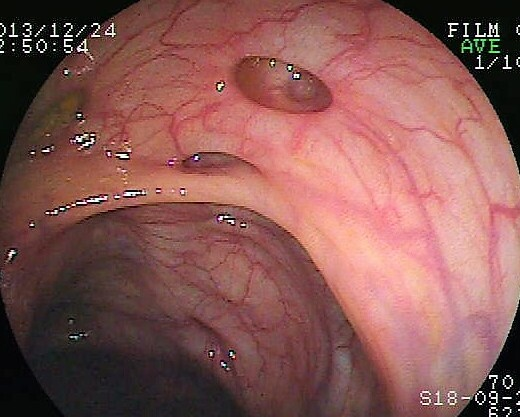
Diverticulosis in the sigmoid colon of a 70-year-old

Some people with diverticulosis complain of symptoms such as cramping, bloating, flatulence, and irregular defecation. However, it is unclear if these symptoms are attributable to the underlying diverticulosis or to coexistent irritable bowel syndrome.

Diverticular disease was found associated with a higher risk of left sided colon cancer.

=== Bleeding ===
Diverticular disease can present with painless rectal bleeding as bright red blood per rectum. Diverticular bleeding is the most common cause of acute lower gastrointestinal bleeding. However, it is estimated that 80% of these cases are self-limiting and require no specific therapy.

=== Diverticulitis ===
Infection of a diverticulum can result in diverticulitis. A 2013 study found that it happens only about 4% of the time. That contradicts the prevailing thinking that 10% to 25% of people with diverticulosis go on to develop diverticulitis. Tears in the colon leading to bleeding or perforations may occur; intestinal obstruction may occur (constipation or diarrhea does not rule out this possibility); and peritonitis, abscess formation, retroperitoneal fibrosis, sepsis, and fistula formation are also possible occurrences. Rarely, an enterolith may form. Infection of a diverticulum often occurs as a result of stool collecting in a diverticulum.

Diverticulitis is defined as diverticular disease with signs and symptoms of diverticular inflammation. Clinical features of acute diverticulitis include constant abdominal pain, localized abdominal tenderness in the left lower quadrant of the abdomen, nausea, vomiting, constipation or diarrhea, fever and leukocytosis.

Most people with colonic diverticulosis are unaware of this structural change. When symptoms do appear in a person over 40 years of age it is important to obtain medical advice and exclude more dangerous conditions such as cancer of the colon or rectum.

=== Segmental colitis associated with diverticulosis ===
Segmental colitis associated with diverticulosis (SCAD) is a condition characterized by localized inflammation of the colon between diverticula (interdiverticular mucosa) while sparing the diverticular orifices. SCAD may lead to abdominal pain, especially in the left lower quadrant, intermittent rectal bleeding, and chronic diarrhea.

== Causes ==
=== Genetics ===
The predisposition to diverticulosis for specific individuals is likely explained by a genetic component, a theory that is supported by studies examining the rates of diverticulosis among twins. The heritability of diverticulosis is estimated to be approximately 40%.

=== Intestinal motility ===
Another theory suggests the degeneration of glial neurons in the myenteric plexus and the interstitial cells of Cajal lead to slowed intestinal movement and consequently fecal content exerts increased pressure on the colon wall resulting in the formation of diverticula.

=== Risk factors ===
1. advanced age
2. connective tissue disorders (such as Marfan syndrome and Ehlers–Danlos syndrome) that may cause weakness in the colon wall
3. hereditary or genetic predisposition
4. extreme weight loss

== Pathophysiology ==
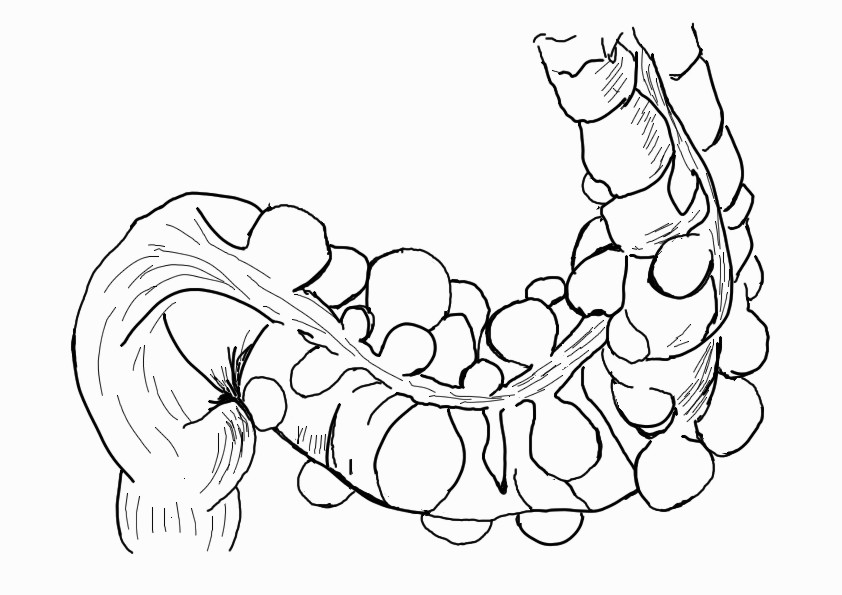
Drawing showing a sigmoid colon with many diverticula

The precise mechanisms by which diverticula are formed are unknown. Multiple theories have been proposed including genetic susceptibility, diet, intestinal motility, changes in the microbiome, and inflammation. One leading theory suggests that diverticula form in weakened areas of the colon wall that are subjected to increased pressure. The strength of the colon wall is known to decrease with age. Previous theories proposed that impacted fecal matter and certain foods would get stuck in diverticula (thereby causing trauma), which caused poor blood flow, death of the affected intestinal wall cells, and intestinal perforation. Newer theories have called this paradigm into question.

== Diagnosis ==
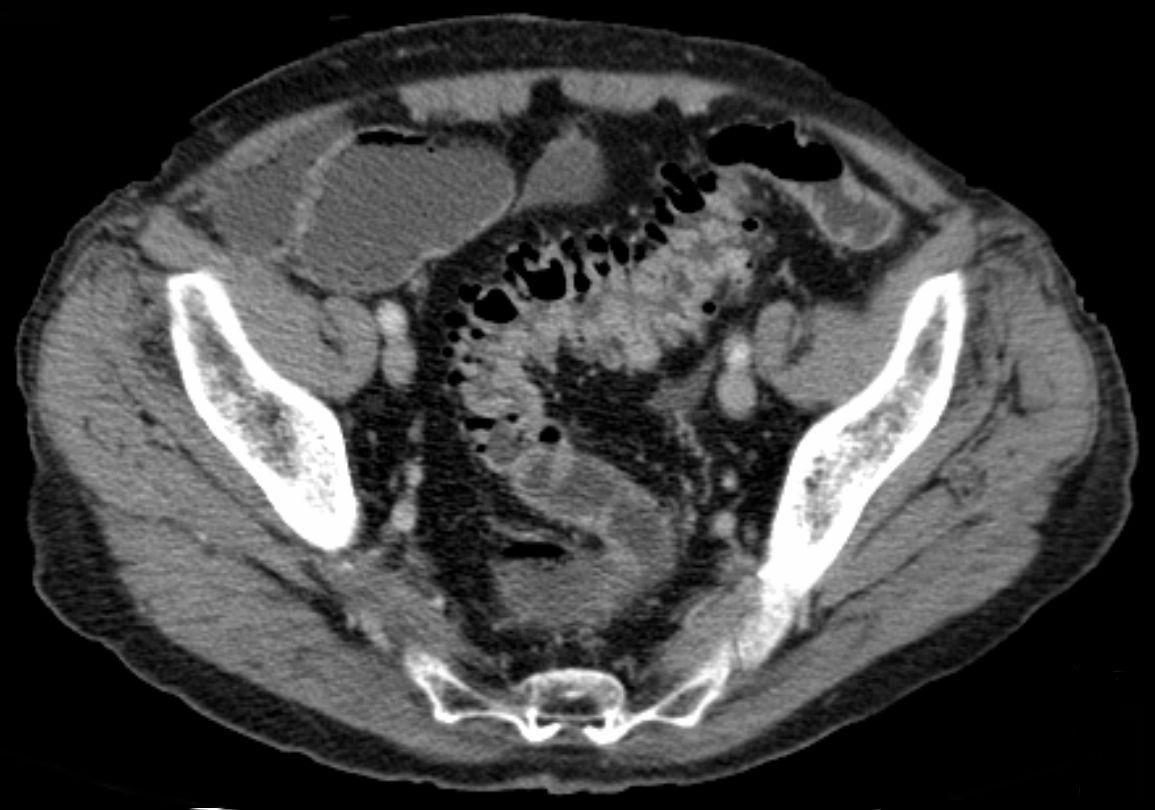
CT scan showing extensive diverticulosis of the sigmoid colon

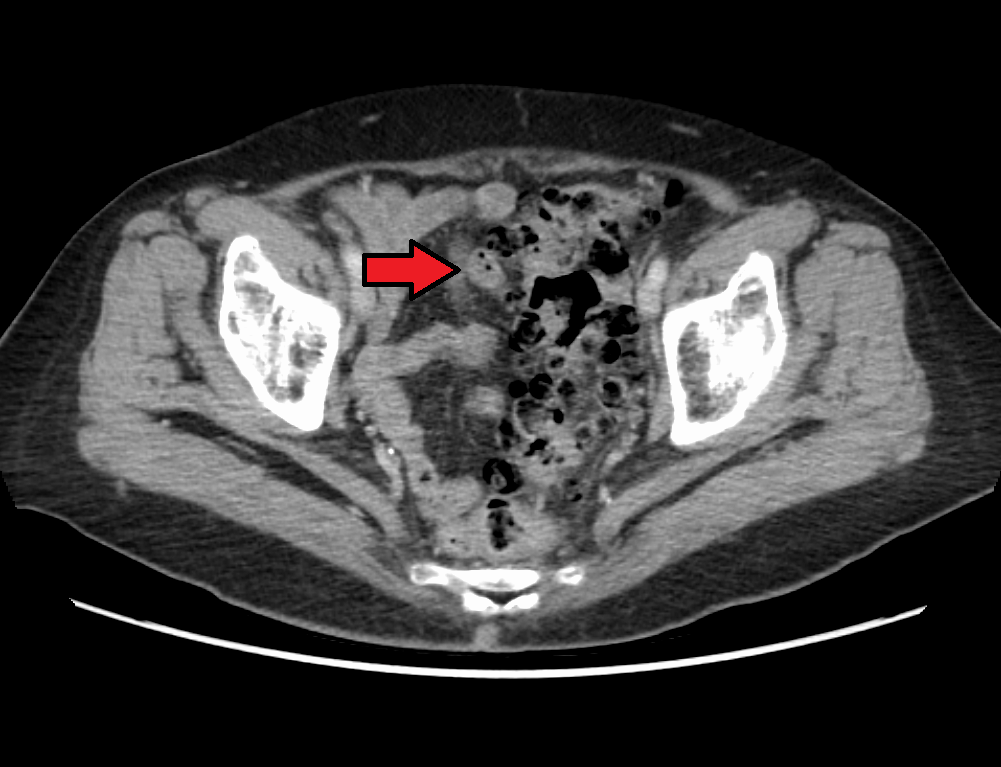
Diverticular disease

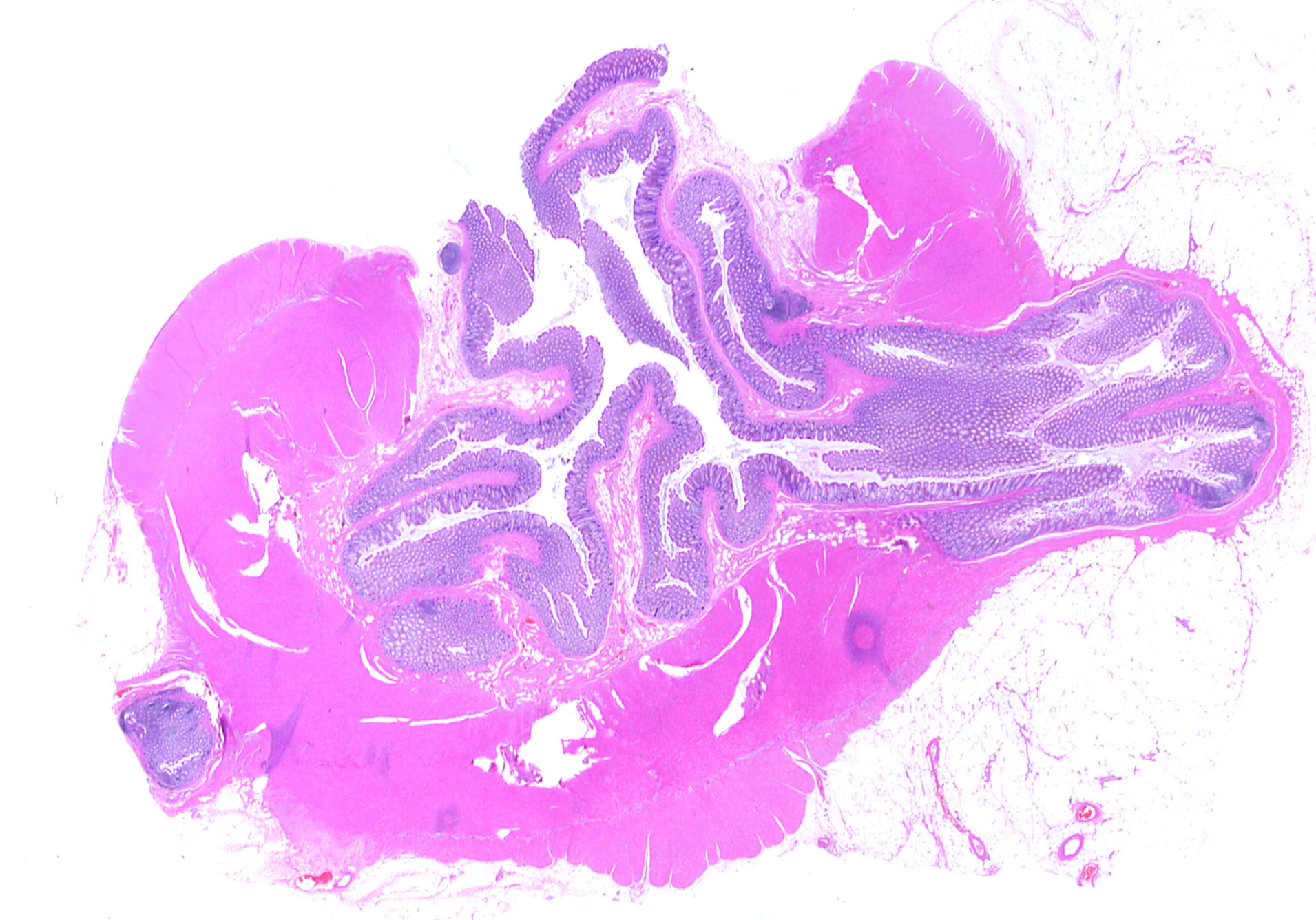
Whole slide of a transverse section of the left colon with diverticulosis

Diverticulosis is defined by the presence of multiple pouches (diverticula) in the colon. In people without symptoms, these are usually found incidentally during other investigations.

While a good history is often sufficient to form a diagnosis of diverticulosis or diverticulitis, it is important to confirm the diagnosis and rule out other pathology (notably colorectal cancer) and complications.

=== Imaging ===
- Barium enema is inferior to colonoscopy in terms of image quality and is usually only performed if the patient has strictures or an excessively tortuous sigmoid colon where colonoscopy is difficult or dangerous.
- Colonoscopy will show the diverticulum and rule out malignancy. A colonoscopy should be performed 4–6 weeks after an acute episode.
- Contrast CT is the investigation of choice in acute episodes of diverticulitis and where complications exist.
- MRI provides a clear picture of the soft tissue of the abdomen, however, its expense often outweighs the benefits when compared to contrast CT or colonoscopy.
- Plain abdominal X-ray may show signs of a thickened wall, ileus, constipation, small bowel obstruction or free air in the case of perforation. Plain X-rays are insufficient to diagnose diverticular disease.
- There is no blood test for diverticulosis.

Both barium enema and colonoscopy are contraindicated during acute episodes of diverticulitis, as the barium may leak into the abdominal cavity, and colonoscopy can cause perforations of the bowel wall.

== Management ==
Many people with diverticulosis have minimal to no symptoms and do not require any specific treatment. Colonic stimulants should be avoided. Treatments, like some colon cleansers, that cause hard stools, constipation, and straining, are not recommended.

=== Diet ===
A high-fiber diet and fiber supplements are advisable to prevent constipation. The Academy of Nutrition and Dietetics recommends 20–35 grams of fiber each day. Wheat bran has been shown to reduce intra colonic pressure.

The US National Institute of Diabetes and Digestive and Kidney Diseases (NIDDK) says foods such as nuts, popcorn hulls, sunflower seeds, pumpkin seeds, caraway seeds, and sesame seeds have traditionally been labeled as problem foods for people with this condition; however, no scientific data exists to prove this hypothesis. The seeds in tomatoes, zucchini, cucumbers, strawberries, raspberries, and poppy seeds, are not considered harmful by the NIDDK.

One study found that nuts and popcorn do not contribute positively or negatively to patients with diverticulosis or diverticular complications.

=== Complications ===
Complicated diverticulosis requires treatment of the complication. These complications are often grouped under a single diagnosis of diverticulitis and require skilled medical care of the infection, bleeding and perforation which may include intensive antibiotic treatment, intravenous fluids, and surgery. Complications are more common in patients who are taking NSAIDs or aspirin. As diverticulosis occurs in an older population such complications are serious events.

== Epidemiology ==
The prevalence of diverticulosis progressively increases with age. Approximately 50% of people over the age of 60 and 70% of people over the age of 80 have diverticulosis. This disease is common in the U.S., Britain, Australia, Canada, and is uncommon in Asia and Africa. Large-mouth diverticula are associated with scleroderma. Diverticular disease is more common in collagen disorders such as Ehlers–Danlos syndrome.

== History ==
The modern emphasis on the value of fiber in the diet began with Thomas L. Cleave. A strong case was made by Neil Painter and Adam Smith that a deficiency of dietary fiber is the cause of diverticular disease. They argued that the colonic muscles needed to contract strongly in order to transmit and expel the small stool associated with a fiber deficient diet. The increased pressure within the segmented section of the bowel over years gave rise to herniation at the vulnerable point where blood vessels enter the colonic wall.

== Society and culture ==
=== Economics ===
It is estimated that diverticulosis costs in total $2.5 billion per year in health care expenditures in the United States alone.

== See also ==
- Salpingitis isthmica nodosa – diverticulosis of the fallopian tube
