= Forrest classification =

Classification of upper gastrointestinal hemorrhage

Forrest classification is a classification of upper gastrointestinal hemorrhage used for purposes of comparison and in selecting patients for endoscopic treatment.

== Forrest classification ==
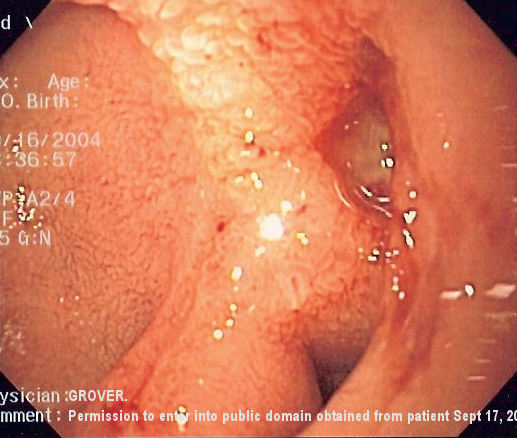
Endoscopy image of a duodenal ulcer in the posterior part of the duodenal bulb without stigmata of recent hemorrhage. This would be a Forrest III lesion

Acute hemorrhage

- Forrest I a (Spurting hemorrhage)
- Forrest I b (Oozing hemorrhage)

Signs of recent hemorrhage

- Forrest II a (Non bleeding Visible vessel)
- Forrest II b (Adherent clot)
- Forrest II c (Flat pigmented haematin (coffee ground base) on ulcer base)

Lesions without active bleeding

- Forrest III (Lesions without signs of recent hemorrhage or fibrin-covered clean ulcer base)

== Application ==
Forrest's classification is instrumental when stratifying patients with upper gastrointestinal hemorrhage into high and low risk categories for mortality. It is also a significant method of prediction of the risk of rebleeding and very often is used for evaluation of the endoscopic intervention modalities. A prospective controlled study revealed that "Forrest criteria are essential for proper planning of endoscopic therapy and urgent surgery in bleeding peptic ulcers".

== History ==
The classification was first published by J.A. Forrest, et al. in the Lancet in 1974.

== See also ==
- Rockall score
- Glasgow-Blatchford
