= Endoclip =

Medical device

A single-use rotatable endoclip in packaging

An endoclip, also referred to as a hemostatic clip or a hemoclip, is a metallic mechanical device used in endoscopy in order to close two mucosal surfaces without the need for surgery and suturing. Its function is similar to a suture in gross surgical applications, as it is used to join together two disjointed surfaces, but, can be applied through the channel of an endoscope under direct visualization. Endoclips have found use in treating gastrointestinal bleeding (both in the upper and lower GI tract), in preventing bleeding after therapeutic procedures such as polypectomy, and in closing gastrointestinal perforations. Many forms of endoclips exist of different shapes and sizes, including two and three prong devices, which can be administered using single use and reloadable systems, and may or may not open and close to facilitate placement.

== Structure and function ==
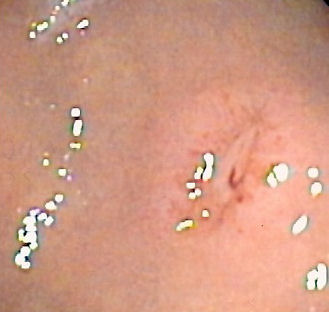
Gastric ulcer with a red spot seen in gastroscopy of a patient with upper gastrointestinal hemorrhage

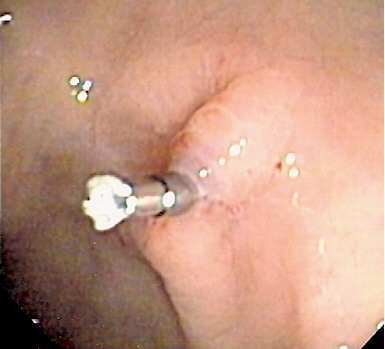
Successful closure of the gastric ulcer with an endoclip

The endoclip was first described by Hayashi and Kudoh in 1975, and was termed the "staunch clip". Initial attempts to incorporate the clip into applications in endoscopy (such as clipping bleeding blood vessels) were limited by the applicator system of the clip. However, by 1988, an easy-to-use applicator delivery system was developed, and a functional reloadable endoclip system was described. This consisted of a stainless steel clip (of size approximately 6 mm long and 1.2 mm wide at the prongs) with a metal deployment device (that could be used to insert the clip into the endoscopic camera, and deployed outside the camera) enclosed in a plastic sheath. These clips were initially reloadable.

Endoclips in use today have a variety of additional shapes and sizes than the original. Clips with two and three prongs (TriClip, Cook Medical) have been described and used for various applications. Rotatable clips have been devised to improve localization of deployment. Also, clips that open and close (as opposed to single-deployment) have also been developed (Resolution Clip, Boston Scientific), and also facilitate the appropriate location of deployment.

When a treatable lesion is identified on endoscopy (such as a bleeding vessel), an endoclip can be inserted through the channel of the endoscope until the sheathed clip is visible on the endoscopic image, and the handle for deployment handed to the nurse assistant. The clip is unsheathed by retraction at the handle, positioned, and "fired" by the assistant to treat the lesion.

== Applications of endoclips ==
=== Gastrointestinal bleeding ===
Endoclips have found a primary application in hemostasis (or the stopping of bleeding) during endoscopy of the upper (through gastroscopy) or lower (through colonoscopy) gastrointestinal tract. Many bleeding lesions have been successfully clipped, including bleeding peptic ulcers, Mallory-Weiss tears of the esophagus, Dieulafoy's lesions, stomach tumours, and bleeding after removal of polyps. Bleeding peptic ulcers require endoscopic treatment if they show evidence of high risk stigmata of re-bleeding, such as evidence of active bleeding or oozing on endoscopy or the presence of a visible blood vessel around the ulcer. The alternatives to endoscopic clipping of peptic ulcers are thermal therapy (such as electrocautery to burn the vessel causing the bleeding), or injection of epinephrine to constrict the blood vessel. Comparative studies between endoclips and thermal therapy make the point that endoclips cause less trauma to the mucosa around the ulcer than electrocautery, but no definitive advantage to either approach has reached consensus by gastroenterologists.

=== Other applications ===
An ulcer seen after polypectomy (left) with a visible vessel suggesting recent bleeding is successfully closed with two endoclips (right)

Endoclips have also found an application in preventing bleeding when performing complicated endoscopic procedures. For example, prophylactic clipping of the base of a polyp has been found to be useful in preventing post-polypectomy bleeding, especially in high-risk patients or patients on anticoagulant medications. In addition, clips can be used to close gastrointestinal perforations that may have been caused by complicated therapeutic endoscopy procedures, such as polypectomy, or by the endoscopic procedure itself. Clips have also been used to secure the placement of endoscopic feeding tubes, and to orient the bile duct to assist with endoscopic retrograde cholangiopancreatography, a procedure used to image to bile duct.

== Safety ==
Endoclips have been seen to dislodge between 1 and 3 weeks from deployment, although lengthy clip retention intervals of as high as 26 months have been reported. Endoclips are believed to be safe and no major complications (such as perforation or impaction) have been reported with them, although concern has been raised about blocking the outflow of the bile duct if clips are deployed in the duodenum.
