= Pancreatic disease =

Disorders of the pancreas

- Specialty: Gastroenterology

Pancreatic diseases are diseases that affect the pancreas, an organ in most vertebrates and in humans and other mammals located in the abdomen. The pancreas plays a role in the digestive and endocrine system, producing enzymes which aid the digestion process and the hormone insulin, which regulates blood sugar levels. The most common pancreatic disease is pancreatitis, an inflammation of the pancreas which could come in acute or chronic form. Other pancreatic diseases include diabetes mellitus, exocrine pancreatic insufficiency, cystic fibrosis, pseudocysts, cysts, congenital malformations, tumors including pancreatic cancer, and hemosuccus pancreaticus.

== Pancreatitis ==
Pancreatitis is inflammation of the pancreas. There are two forms of pancreatitis, which are different in causes and symptoms, and require different treatment:

- Acute pancreatitis is a rapid-onset inflammation of the pancreas, most frequently caused by alcoholism or gallstones. Less frequent but important causes are hypertriglyceridemia, drugs, infections.
- Chronic pancreatitis is a long-standing inflammation of the pancreas.

== Diabetes mellitus ==
The pancreas is central in the pathophysiology of both major types of diabetes mellitus. In type 1 diabetes mellitus, there is direct damage to the endocrine pancreas that results in insufficient insulin synthesis and secretion. Type 2 diabetes mellitus, which begins with insulin resistance, is characterized by the ultimate failure of pancreatic β cells to match insulin production with insulin demand.

== Exocrine pancreatic insufficiency ==
Exocrine pancreatic insufficiency (EPI) is the inability to properly digest food due to a lack of digestive enzymes made by the pancreas. EPI is found in humans affected by cystic fibrosis and Shwachman–Diamond syndrome. It is caused by a progressive loss of the pancreatic cells that make digestive enzymes. Chronic pancreatitis is the most common cause of EPI in humans. Loss of digestive enzymes leads to maldigestion and malabsorption of nutrients.

== Cystic fibrosis ==
Cystic fibrosis is a hereditary disease that affects the entire body, causing progressive disability and early death. It is caused by a mutation in the cystic fibrosis transmembrane conductance regulator (CFTR) gene. The product of this gene helps create sweat, digestive juices, and mucus. The name cystic fibrosis refers to the characteristic 'fibrosis' (tissue scarring) and cyst formation within the pancreas, causing irreversible damage, and often resulting in painful inflammation (pancreatitis).

== Pseudocysts ==
A pancreatic pseudocyst is a circumscribed collection of fluid rich in amylase and other pancreatic enzymes, blood and necrotic tissue, typically located in the lesser sac.

== Cysts ==
A pancreatic cyst is a fluid filled sac within the pancreas. They can be benign or malignant.

X-ray computed tomography (CT scan) findings of cysts in the pancreas are common, and often are benign. In a study of 2,832 patients without pancreatic disease, 73 patients (2.6%) had cysts in the pancreas. About 85% of these patients had a single cyst. Cysts ranged in size from 2 to 38 mm (mean, 8.9 mm). There was a strong correlation between the presence of cysts and age. No cysts were identified among patients less than 40 years of age, while 8.7 percent of the patients aged 80 to 89 years had a pancreatic cyst.

Cysts also may be present due to intraductal papillary mucinous neoplasm.

== Congenital malformations ==
=== Pancreas divisum ===
Pancreas divisum is a malformation in which the pancreas fails to fuse. It is a rare condition that affects only 6% of the world's population, and of these few, only 1% ever have symptoms that require surgery.

=== Annular pancreas ===
Annular pancreas is characterized by a pancreas that encircles the duodenum. It results from an embryological malformation in which the early pancreatic buds undergo inappropriate rotation and fusion, which can lead to small bowel obstruction.

== Tumors and cancer ==
- Pancreatic tumors (masses) including pancreatic cancer

=== Benign ===
- Serous cystadenoma of the pancreas
- Solid pseudopapillary neoplasm

=== Tumor predisposition ===
==== Zollinger-Ellison syndrome ====
Zollinger-Ellison syndrome is a collection of findings in individuals with gastrinoma, a tumor of the gastrin-producing cells of the pancreas. Unbridled gastrin secretion results in elevated levels of the hormone, and increased hydrochloric acid secretion from parietal cells of the stomach. It can lead to ulceration and scarring of the stomach and intestinal mucosa.

== Hemosuccus pancreaticus ==
Hemosuccus pancreaticus, also known as pseudohematobilia or Wirsungorrhage, is a rare cause of hemorrhage in the gastrointestinal tract. It is caused by a bleeding source in the pancreas, pancreatic duct, or structures adjacent to the pancreas, such as the splenic artery, that bleed into the pancreatic duct. Patients with hemosuccus may develop symptoms of gastrointestinal hemorrhage, such as blood in the stools, maroon stools, or melena. They may also develop abdominal pain. Hemosuccus pancreaticus is associated with pancreatitis, pancreatic cancer and aneurysms of the splenic artery. Angiography may be used to diagnose hemosuccus pancreaticus, where the celiac axis is injected to determine the blood vessel that is bleeding. Concomitant embolization of the end vessel may terminate the hemorrhage. Alternatively, a distal pancreatectomy may be required to stop the hemorrhage.
