= Hemosuccus pancreaticus =

- Other names: Pseudohematobilia, Wirsungorrhage
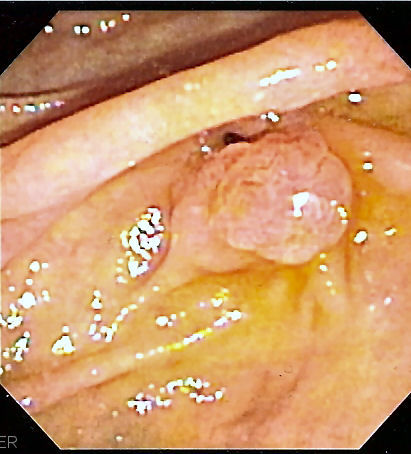
- The pancreatic duct orifice is seen on the side of the duodenum, at the ampulla of Vater, which may necessitate the use of side-viewing endoscopes to diagnose hemosuccus pancreaticus.
- Specialty: Gastroenterology

Hemosuccus pancreaticus is a rare cause of hemorrhage in the gastrointestinal tract. It is caused by a bleeding source in the pancreas, pancreatic duct, or structures adjacent to the pancreas, such as the splenic artery, that bleed into the pancreatic duct, which is connected with the bowel at the duodenum, the first part of the small intestine. Patients with hemosuccus may develop symptoms of gastrointestinal hemorrhage, such as blood in the stools, maroon stools, or melena, which is a dark, tarry stool caused by digestion of red blood cells. They may also develop abdominal pain. It is associated with pancreatitis, pancreatic cancer and aneurysms of the splenic artery. Hemosuccus may be identified with endoscopy (esophagogastroduodenoscopy), where fresh blood may be seen from the pancreatic duct. Alternatively, angiography may be used to inject the celiac axis to determine the blood vessel that is bleeding. This may also be used to treat hemosuccus, as embolization of the end vessel may terminate the hemorrhage. However, a distal pancreatectomy—surgery to remove of the tail of the pancreas—may be required to stop the hemorrhage.

== Signs and symptoms ==
Hemosuccus pancreaticus is a rare entity, and estimates of its rate are based on small case series. It is the least frequent cause of upper gastrointestinal bleeding (1/1500) and is most often caused by chronic pancreatitis, pancreatic pseudocysts, or pancreatic tumors. As a result, the diagnosis may easily be overlooked. The usual presentation of hemosuccus is the development of symptoms of upper or lower gastrointestinal bleeding, such as melena (or dark, black tarry stools), maroon stools, or hematochezia, which is frank rectal bleeding. The source of hemorrhage is usually not determined by standard endoscopic techniques, and the symptoms of the condition are usually grouped as a cause of obscure overt gastrointestinal hemorrhage. Over one-half of patients with hemosuccus also develop abdominal pain, usually located in the epigastrium, or uppermost part of the abdomen. The pain is described as being "crescendo-decrescendo" in nature, meaning that it increases and decreases in intensity slowly with time. This is thought to be due to transient blockage of the pancreatic duct from the source of bleeding, or from clots. If the source of the bleeding also involves obstruction of the common bile duct (such as with some tumours of the head of the pancreas), the patient may develop jaundice, or "silver stools", an uncommon finding of acholic stools mixed with blood.

== Causes ==
The causes of hemosuccus pancreaticus can be grouped into diseases of the pancreas and diseases of the vascular structures around the pancreas. Diseases of the pancreas include acute and chronic pancreatitis, pancreatic cancer, pancreatic duct stones, ruptured aneurysms of the splenic artery, and pseudoaneurysms of the splenic artery and hepatic artery. Pseudoaneurysms are complications of pancreatitis where a pseudocyst is formed, with one wall abutting an artery, usually the splenic artery. Should the arterial wall rupture, the pseudoaneurysm will hemorrhage into the pancreatic duct.

Rarely the bleeding is not channeled into the bowel from the main pancreatic duct (or duct of Wirsung), but rather comes from the accessory pancreatic duct (or duct of Santorini). The former is termed Wirsungorrhage and the latter is termed Santorinirrhage. Bleeding from the duct of Santorini can be caused by pancreas divisum, a possible congenital cause of pancreatitis.

== Testing and diagnosis ==
The diagnosis of hemosuccus pancreaticus can be difficult to make. Most patients who develop bleeding in the gastrointestinal tract have endoscopic procedures done to visualize the bowel in order to find and treat the source of the bleeding. With hemosuccus, the bleeding is coming from the pancreatic duct which enters into the first part of the small intestine, termed the duodenum. Typical gastroscopes used to visualize the esophagus, stomach and duodenum are designed with fiber-optic illumination that is directed in the same direction as the endoscope, meaning that visualization is in the forward direction. However, the pancreatic duct orifice is located on the side of the duodenum, meaning that it can be missed on forward-viewing endoscopy. A side-viewing endoscope (known as a duodenoscope, or side-viewer) used for endoscopic retrograde cholangiopancreatography (ERCP), a procedure to visualize the bile ducts and pancreatic duct on fluoroscopy, can be used to localize the bleeding to the pancreatic duct. It can be confused with bleeding from the common bile duct on endoscopy, leading to the term pseudohematobilia.

Liver function test is normal apart from an increased serum bilirubin in the event of pancreaticobiliary reflux. Serum amylase is normal outside episodes of acute pancreatitis. It is difficult to diagnose HP because the bleeding is usually intermittent. Endoscopy is essential in ruling out other causes of upper gastrointestinal bleeding and in rare cases; active bleeding can be seen from the duodenal ampulla. Even though endoscopy may be normal, it helps to rule out other causes of upper digestive bleeding (erosive gastritis, peptic ulcers, and oesophageal and gastric fundus varices, etc.). Ultrasonography can be used to visualize pancreatic pseudocysts or aneurysm of the peripancreatic arteries. Doppler ultrasound or dynamic ultrasound has been reported to be diagnostic. Contrast-enhanced CT is an excellent modality for demonstrating the pancreatic pathology and can also demonstrate features of chronic pancreatitis, pseudocysts, and pseudoaneurysms. On precontrast CT, the characteristic finding of clotted blood in the pancreatic duct, known as the sentinel clot, is seldom seen. Computed tomography may show simultaneous opacification of an aneurysmal artery and pseudocyst or persistence of contrast within a pseudocyst after the arterial phase. Again, these findings are only suggestive of the diagnosis. Ultimately, angiography is the diagnostic reference standard. Angiography identifies the causative artery and allows for delineation of the arterial anatomy and therapeutic intervention.

== Treatment ==
Treatment of hemosuccus pancreaticus depends on the source of the hemorrhage. If the bleeding is identified on angiography to be coming from a vessel that is small enough to occlude, embolization through angiography may stop the bleeding. Both coils in the end-artery and stents across the area of bleeding have been used to control the hemorrhage. However, the bleeding may be refractory to the embolization, which would necessitate surgery to remove the pancreas at the source of hemorrhage. Also, the cause of bleeding may be too diffuse to be treated with embolization (such as with pancreatitis or with pancreatic cancer). This may also require surgical therapy, and usually a distal pancreatectomy, or removal of the part of the pancreas from the area of bleeding to the tail, is required.

== History ==
Hemosuccus pancreaticus was first described as a cause of hemorrhage in 1931 by Lower and Farrell, who described an aneurysm of the splenic artery causing bleeding through the pancreatic duct. In 1969, Vankemmel proposed the term "wirsungorrhagia" (currently used in France). In 1970, Sandblom published three cases and coined the term "hemosuccus pancreaticus" to describe the similarity of the disorder to the clinical syndrome of hemobilia.
