= Haemobilia =

- Other names: Haemorrhage in bile, Haematobilia, Hematobilia, Hemobilia, Hemobilia (disorder)
- Specialty: Gastroenterology

Haemobilia is a medical condition of bleeding into the biliary tree. Haemobilia occurs when there is a fistula between a vessel of the splanchnic circulation and the intrahepatic or extrahepatic biliary system. It can present as acute upper gastrointestinal (UGI) bleeding. It should be considered in upper abdominal pain presenting with UGI bleeding especially when there is a history of liver injury or instrumentation.

Haemobilia was first recorded in 1654 by Francis Glisson, a Cambridge professor.

== Presentation ==
Quincke's triad of upper abdominal pain, upper gastrointestinal haemorrhage and jaundice is classical but only present in 22% cases.

It can be immediately life-threatening in major bleeding. However, in minor haemobilia, patient is haemodynamically stable despite significant blood loss being apparent.

== Causes ==
The causes of haemobilia include trauma (which can be accidental or iatrogenic due to procedures such as cholecystectomy), instrumentation (especially after ERCP), gallstone, inflammatory conditions ranging from ascariasis to PAN, vascular malformation, tumors, coagulopathy, and liver biopsy.

== Diagnosis ==
Combination of EGD, CT scan and angiography depending on clinical situation, bearing in mind that haemobilia may present many days after injury. Cholangiography is performed if there is a percutaneous access or if ERCP is undertaken.

== Management ==
Most bleeding from instrumentation are minor and would settle spontaneously.

When indicated, management is directed towards stopping bleeding and relieving obstruction if present, which is achieved either by surgical ligation of hepatic artery or by endovascular embolisation. Endovasculartrans-arterial embolisation (TAE) is preferred initially because of high success rate and less complication. TAE involves the selective catheterization of a hepatic artery followed by embolic occlusion. Surgery is indicated when TAE has failed or sepsis present in biliary tree or drainage has failed.
