= Gastric lymphoma =

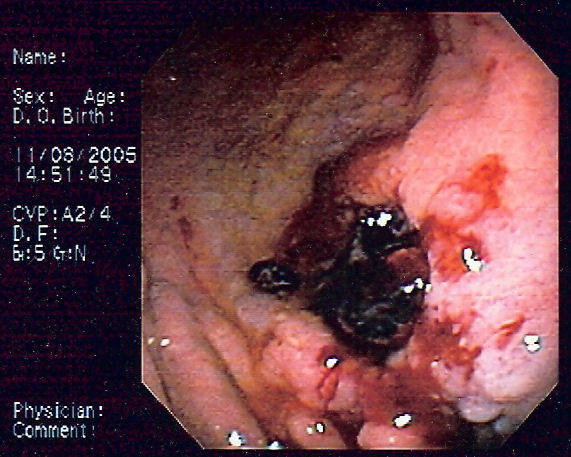
- Endoscopic image of gastric MALT lymphoma taken in body of stomach in patient who presented with upper GI hemorrhage. Appearance is similar to gastric ulcer with adherent blood clot.
- Specialty: Oncology

Primary gastric lymphoma (lymphoma that originates in the stomach itself) is an uncommon condition, accounting for less than 15% of gastric malignancies and about 2% of all lymphomas. However, the stomach is a very common extranodal site for lymphomas (lymphomas originate elsewhere and metastasise to the stomach). It is also the most common source of lymphomas in the gastrointestinal tract.

== Signs and symptoms ==
Symptoms include epigastric pain, early satiety, fatigue and weight loss. Most people affected by primary gastric lymphoma are over 60 years old.

== Risk factors ==
Risk factors for gastric lymphoma include the following:

- Helicobacter pylori
- Long-term immunosuppressant drug therapy
- HIV infection

== Pathophysiology ==
The majority of gastric lymphomas are non-Hodgkin's lymphoma of B-cell origin. These tumors may range from well-differentiated, superficial involvements (MALT) to high-grade, large-cell lymphomas. Sometimes, it's hard to differentiate poorly differentiated high grade B-cell gastric lymphoma from gastric adenocarcinoma clinically or radiologically, yet histopathology with immunohistochemistry is recommended to stain specific markers on the malignant cell that favor the diagnosis of lymphoma. Immunohistochemistry stains specific clusters of differentiation that are present on B-cells like CD20. Cytokeratin is also a surface marker that is presented on epithelial cells, is stained histochemically and favors the diagnosis of epithelial tumors like adenocarcinoma.

Distinguishing poorly differentiated gastric lymphoma from adenocarcinoma is essential because the prognosis and modalities of treatment differ significantly.

Other lymphomas involving the stomach include mantle cell lymphoma and T-cell lymphomas which may be associated with enteropathy; the latter usually occur in the small bowel but have been reported in the stomach.

== Diagnosis ==
These lymphomas are difficult to differentiate from gastric adenocarcinoma. The lesions are usually ulcers with a ragged, thickened mucosal pattern on contrast radiographs.

The diagnosis is typically made by biopsy at the time of endoscopy. Several endoscopic findings have been reported, including solitary ulcers, thickened gastric folds, mass lesions and nodules. As there may be infiltration of the submucosa, larger biopsy forceps, endoscopic ultrasound guided biopsy, endoscopic submucosal resection, or laparotomy may be required to obtain tissue.

Imaging investigations including CT scans or endoscopic ultrasound are useful to stage disease. Hematological parameters are usually checked to assist with staging and to exclude concomitant leukemia. An elevated LDH level may be suggestive of lymphoma.

== Treatment ==
Diffuse large B-cell lymphomas of the stomach are primarily treated with chemotherapy with CHOP (cyclophosphamide+doxorubicine+vincristine+prednisone) with or without rituximab being a usual first choice.

Antibiotic treatment to eradicate H. pylori is indicated as first line therapy for MALT lymphomas. About 80% of MALT lymphomas completely regress with eradication therapy. Radiation treatment for H. pylori–negative gastric malt lymphoma, has a high success rate, 90% or better after 5 years. Second line therapy for MALT lymphomas is usually chemotherapy with a single agent, and complete response rates of greater than 70% have been reported.

Subtotal gastrectomy, with post-operative chemotherapy is undertaken in refractory cases, or in the setting of complications, including gastric outlet obstruction.

== See also ==
- Lymphoepithelial lesion
