= Lymphoepithelial lesion =

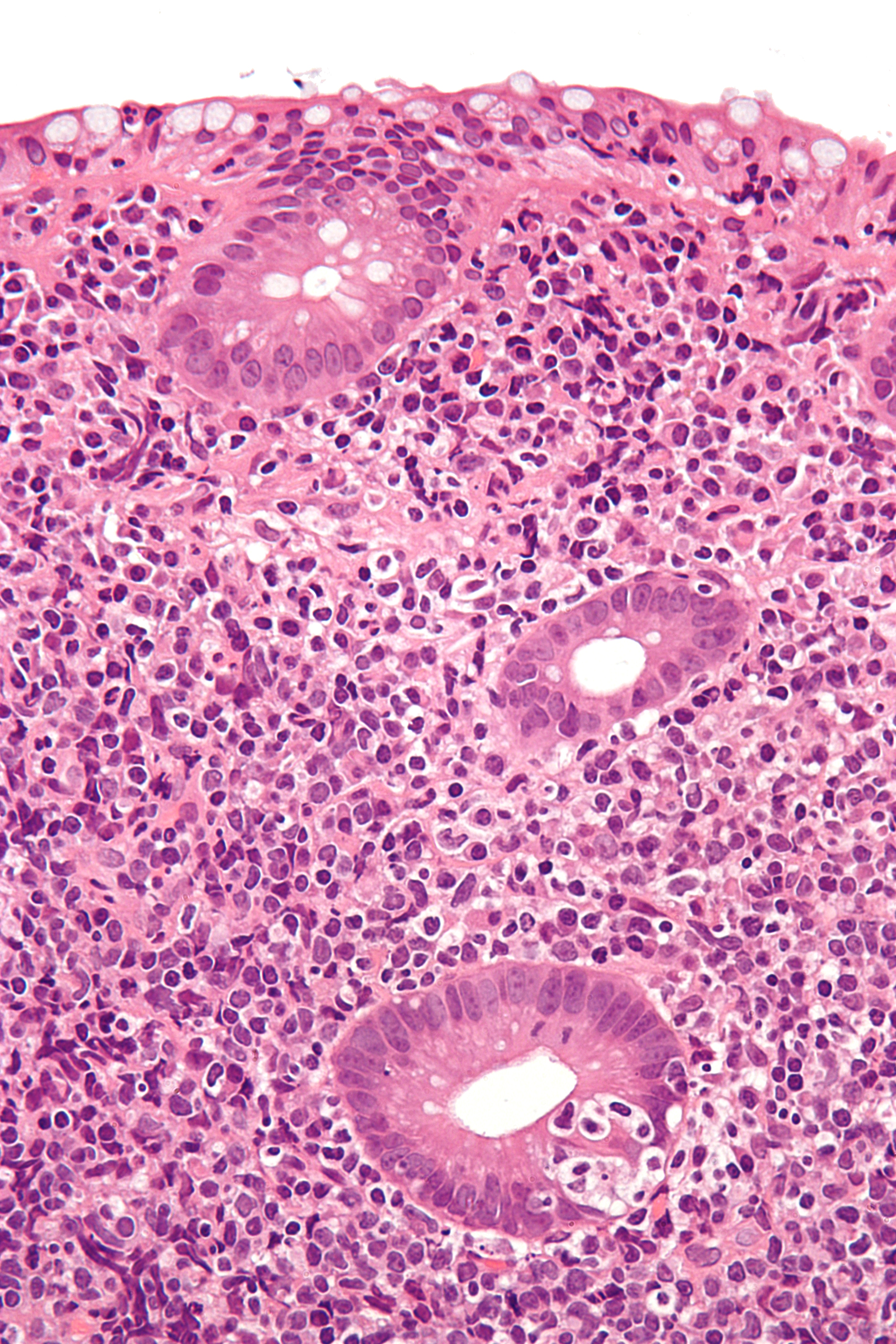
Micrograph showing a lymphoepithelial lesion (lower right of image) in a primary gastrointestinal tract lymphoma. H&E stain.

In pathology, lymphoepithelial lesion refers to a discrete abnormality that consists of lymphoid cells and epithelium, which may or may not be benign.

It may refer to a benign lymphoepithelial lesion of the parotid gland or benign lymphoepithelial lesion of the lacrimal gland, or may refer to the infiltration of malignant lymphoid cells into epithelium, in the context of primary gastrointestinal lymphoma.

In the context of GI tract lymphoma, it is most often associated with MALT lymphomas.

== See also ==
- Gastric lymphoma
- MALT lymphoma
