= Dieulafoy's lesion =

- Other names: Exulceratio simplex Dieulafoy
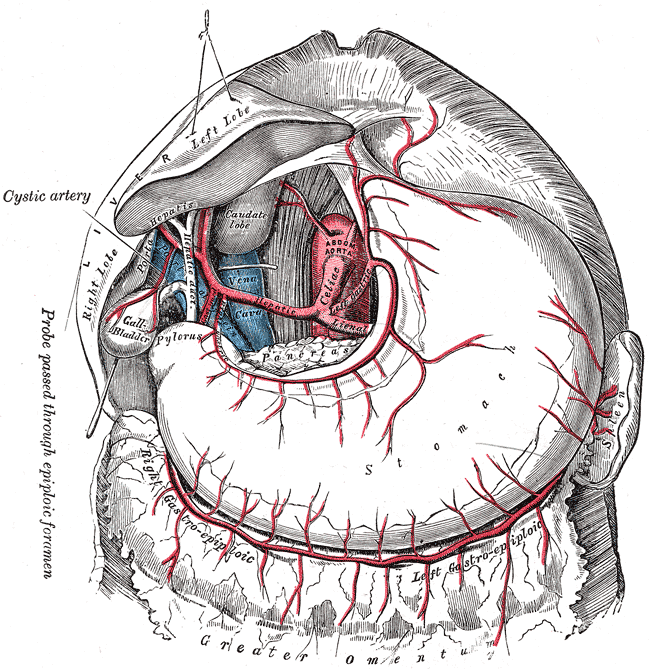
- Blood supply of stomach
- Pronunciation: "Do-la-foy"
- Specialty: Gastroenterology
- Symptoms: Hematemesis, melena, hematochezia, anemia
- Usual onset: 52 years (average age)
- Causes: Aberrant submucosal arteriole
- Diagnostic method: Upper endoscopy
- Treatment: Endoscopic therapy with endoclip, argon plasma coagulation, electrocautery, epinephrine injection, etc
- Prognosis: 8% mortality
- Frequency: 1.5% of gastrointestinal bleeding

Dieulafoy's lesion (French: [djølafwa]) is a medical condition characterized by a large tortuous artery most commonly in the stomach wall (submucosal) that erodes and bleeds. It can present in any part of the gastrointestinal tract. It can cause gastric hemorrhage but is relatively uncommon. It is thought to cause less than 5% of all gastrointestinal bleeds in adults. It was named after French surgeon Paul Georges Dieulafoy, who described this condition in his paper "Exulceratio simplex: Leçons 1-3" in 1898. It is also called "caliber-persistent artery" or "aneurysm" of gastric vessels. However, unlike most other aneurysms, these are thought to be developmental malformations rather than degenerative changes.

== Signs and symptoms ==
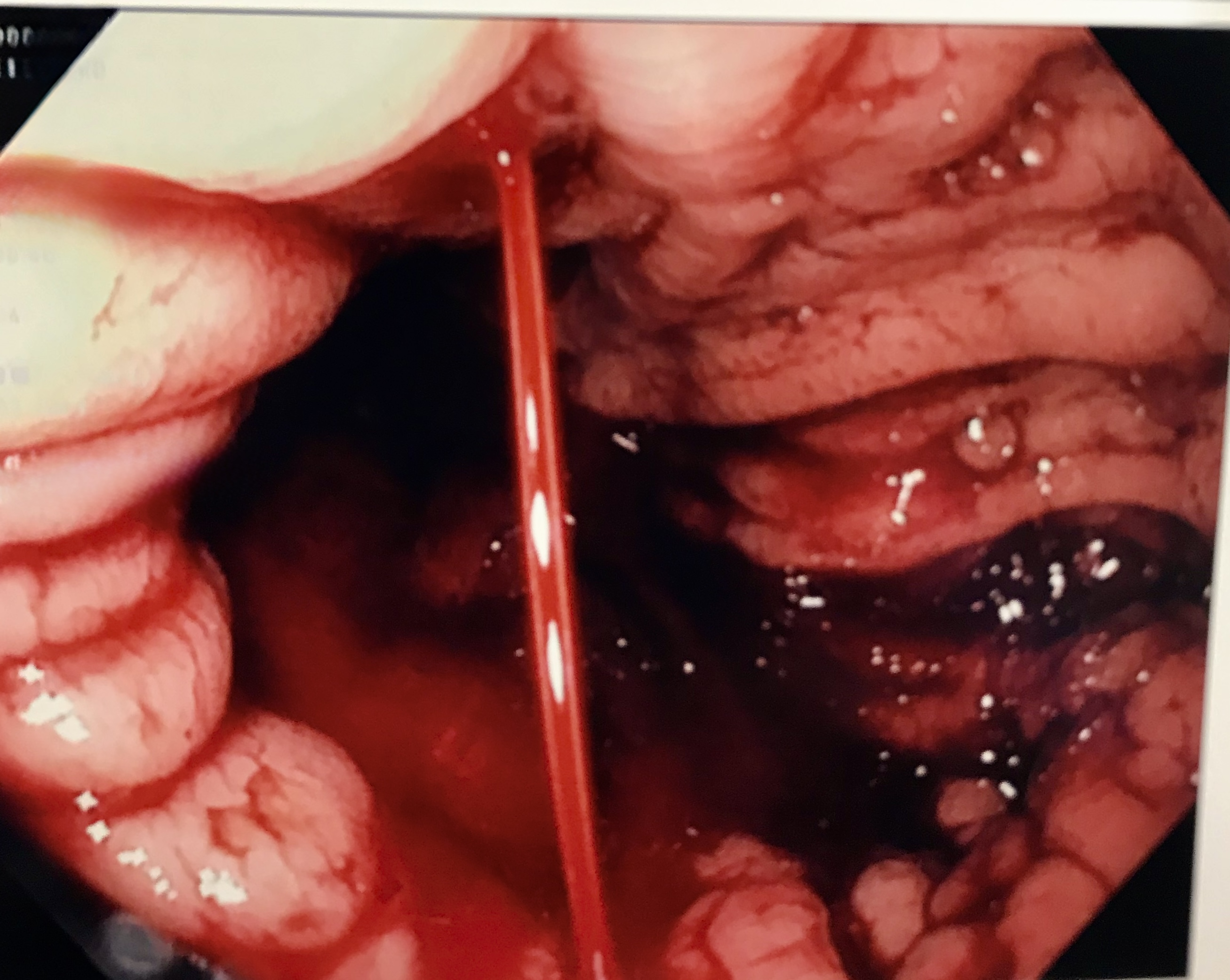
Active bleeding from Dieulafoy’s lesion, 2021

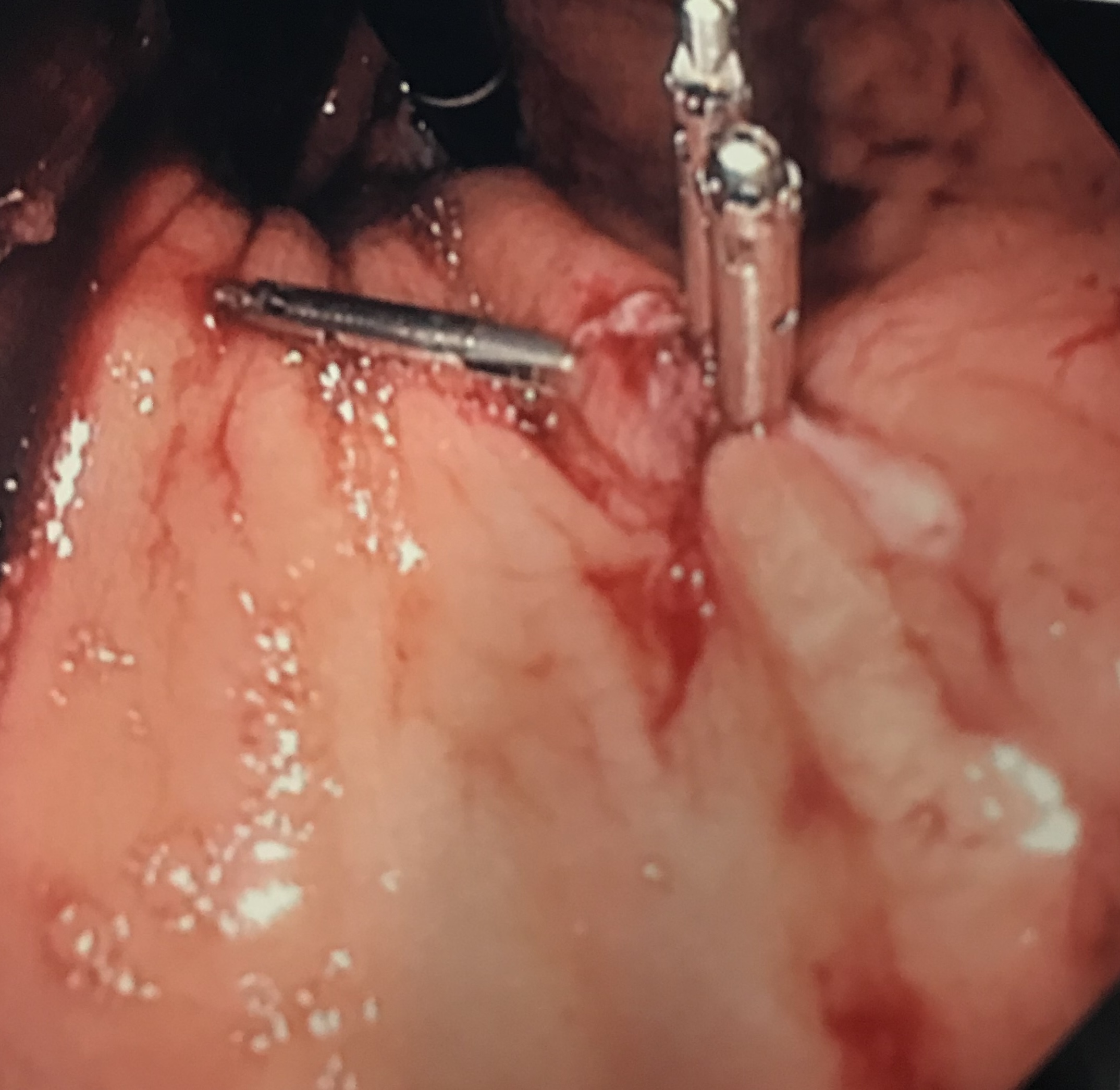
Hemoclipping of the above Dieulafoy’s lesion

Dieulafoy's lesion often do not cause symptoms (asymptomatic). When present, symptoms usually relate to painless bleeding, with vomiting blood (hematemesis) and/or black stools (melena). Less often, Dieulafoy's lesions may cause rectal bleeding (hematochezia), or rarely, iron deficiency anemia. Usually, there are no gastrointestinal symptoms that precede the bleeding (abdominal pain, nausea, etc.).

Presenting Symptoms
Recurrent hematemesis with melena	51% of cases
Hematemesis without melena	28% of cases
Melena without hematemesis	18% of cases

Though exceptionally rare, cases of Dieulafoy lesions occurring in the gallbladder can cause upper abdominal pain, which is usually right upper quadrant or upper middle (epigastric). Though gallbladder Dieulafoy lesions usually occur with anemia (83%), they generally do not cause overt bleeding (hematochezia, hematemesis, melena, etc.).

== Cause ==
In contrast to peptic ulcer disease, a history of alcohol use disorder or NSAID use is usually absent in Dieulafoy's lesion.

== Pathophysiology ==
Dieulafoy lesions are characterized by a single abnormally large blood vessel (arteriole) beneath the gastrointestinal mucosa (submucosa) that bleeds, in the absence of any ulcer, erosion, or other abnormality in the mucosa. The size of these blood vessels varies from 1–5 mm (more than 10 times the normal diameter of mucosal capillaries). Pulsation from the enlarged vessels leads to focal pressure that causes thinning of the mucosa at that location, leading to exposure of the vessel and subsequent hemorrhage.

Approximately 75% of Dieulafoy's lesions occur in the upper part of the stomach within 6 cm of the gastroesophageal junction, most commonly in the lesser curvature. However, Dieulafoy's lesions may occur in any part of the gastrointestinal tract. Extragastric lesions have historically been thought to be uncommon but have been identified more frequently in recent years, likely due to increased awareness of the condition. The duodenum is the most common location (14%) followed by the colon (5%), surgical anastamoses (5%), the jejunum (1%) and the esophagus (1%). Dieulafoy's lesions have been reported in the gallbladder. The pathology in these extragastric locations is essentially the same as that of the more common gastric lesion.

== Diagnosis ==
A Dieulafoy's lesion is difficult to diagnose, because of the intermittent pattern of bleeding. Dieulafoy's lesion are typically diagnosed during endoscopic evaluation, usually during upper endoscopy, which may show an isolated protruding blood vessel. Lesions affecting the colon or end of the small bowel (terminal ileum) may be diagnosed during colonoscopy. Dieulafoy's lesions are not easily recognized and therefore multiple evaluations with endoscopy may be necessary. Once identified during endoscopy, the mucosa near a Dieulafoy's lesion may be injected with ink. Tattooing the area can aid in identifying the location of the Dieulafoy's lesion in the event of rebleeding. Endoscopic ultrasound has been used both to facilitate identification of Dieulafoy lesions and confirm the treatment success.

Angiography may be helpful with diagnosis, though this only identifies bleeding that actively occurs during the time of that test. Mesenteric angiography may be particularly helpful for Dieulafoy lesions in the colon or rectum, where the evaluation may be limited by the presence of blood or poor bowel preparation.

== Treatment ==
In most cases, Dieulafoy lesions are treated with endoscopic interventions. Endoscopic techniques used in the treatment include epinephrine injection followed by bipolar or monopolar electrocoagulation, injection sclerotherapy, heater probe, laser photocoagulation, hemoclipping or banding.

In cases of refractory bleeding, interventional radiology may be consulted for an angiogram with subselective embolization.

== Prognosis ==
The mortality rate for Dieulafoy's was much higher before the era of endoscopy, where open surgery was the only treatment option. Mortality has decreased from 80% to 8% as a result of endoscopic therapies. Long term control of bleeding (hemostasis) is achieved in 85 - 90 percent of cases.

== Epidemiology ==
Dieulafoy's lesions account for roughly 1.5 percent of gastrointestinal hemorrhage. These lesions are twice as common in men, and often occur in older individuals (over 50 years of age) with multiple comorbidities, including hypertension, cardiovascular disease, chronic kidney disease, and diabetes. Dieulafoy's lesions present in individuals with an average age of 52 years.

== History ==
Dieulafoy's lesion was first described in 1884 by M.T. Gallard. The lesion was named after French surgeon Paul Georges Dieulafoy, who described the condition in his paper "Exulceratio simplex: Leçons 1-3" in 1898. Dieulafoy believed (incorrectly) the bleeding from this lesion was due to erosions of the mucosa in the stomach.
