= Benign lymphoepithelial lesion =

- Other names: BLEL, Mikulicz' disease
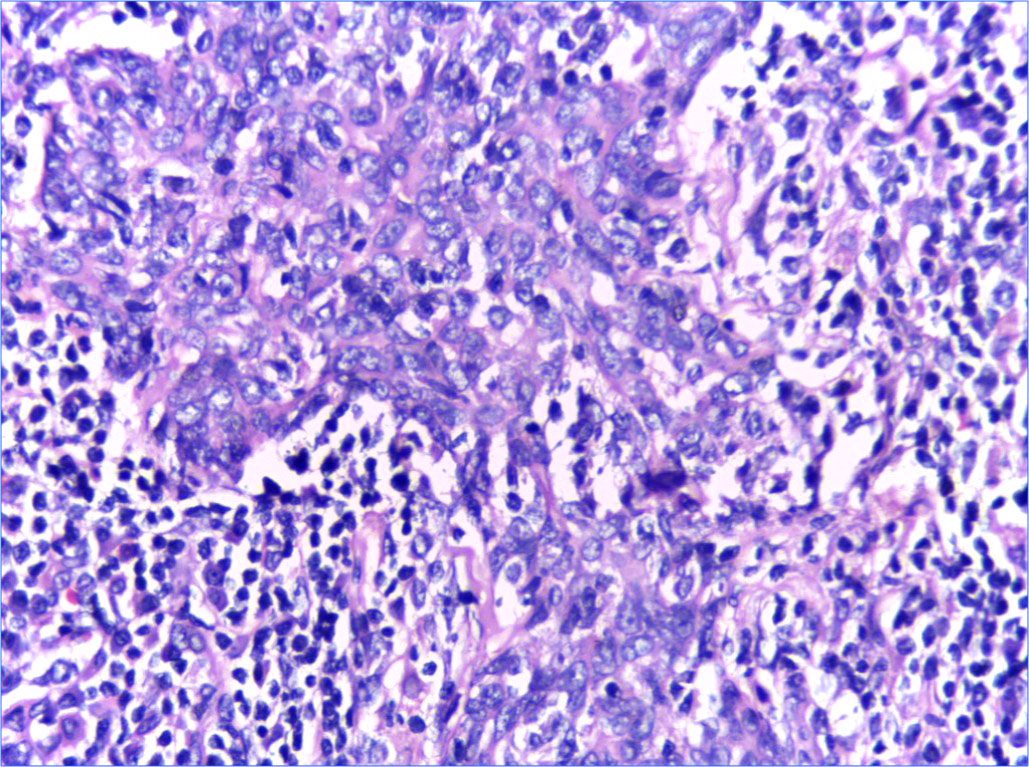
- Specialty: Gastroenterology

Benign lymphoepithelial lesion (BLEL), historically termed Mikulicz’ disease, is a benign inflammatory condition marked by painless enlargement of major exocrine glands, particularly the parotid and lacrimal glands. It is characterized histologically by dense lymphocytic infiltration and associated epithelial proliferation within glandular tissue.

BLEL may occur in isolation or in association with autoimmune disorders. It is frequently, but not always, associated with Sjögren’s syndrome.

Although BLEL is benign, long-standing lymphoepithelial lesions, particularly in patients with Sjögren’s syndrome, are associated with an increased risk of malignant transformation to extranodal marginal zone B-cell lymphoma (MALT lymphoma).

== Signs and symptoms ==
Clinically, a benign lymphoepithelial lesion manifests as:

- painless bilateral symmetric swelling of the lacrimal and salivary glands
- xerostomia (mouth dryness) due to salivary gland dysfunction and
- xerophthalmia (eye dryness) due to lacrimal gland dysfunction

== Treatment ==
Benign lymphoepithelial lesions, particularly when classified as part of IgG4-related disease rather than classic Sjögren’s syndrome, are typically managed with systemic corticosteroids, which often lead to rapid reduction in gland enlargement and improvement in symptoms. Glucocorticoids such as prednisolone or methylprednisolone are commonly used and can result in decreased serum IgG4 levels and shrinkage of affected glands.

In cases where steroid response is inadequate or relapse occurs, additional immunosuppressive therapy (e.g., azathioprine, mycophenolate, rituximab) may be considered as steroid-sparing or adjunctive treatment. Supportive care for associated dryness (e.g., artificial tears or saliva substitutes) may also be used when glandular dysfunction is present. Long-term monitoring is important due to the chronic nature of the disease and potential for recurrence.

== Eponym ==
Historically, bilateral parotid and lacrimal gland enlargement was characterized by the term Mikulicz' disease if the enlargement appeared apart from other diseases. If it was secondary to another disease, such as tuberculosis, sarcoidosis, lymphoma, and Sjögren's syndrome, the term used was Mikulicz's syndrome. Both names derive from Jan Mikulicz-Radecki, the Polish surgeon best known for describing these conditions.

In more recent times, the terms "Mikulicz's disease" and "Mikulicz's syndrome" were viewed as ambiguous and outdated by some sources.

Today Mikulicz's disease is considered to be a subtype of IgG4-related disease, usually accompanied by involvement of one or more other organs in the body.

== See also ==
- Lymphoepithelial lesion
