= Peptic ulcer disease =

Ulceration of the gastrointestinal tract

- Other names: Peptic ulcer, stomach ulcer, gastric ulcer, duodenal ulcer
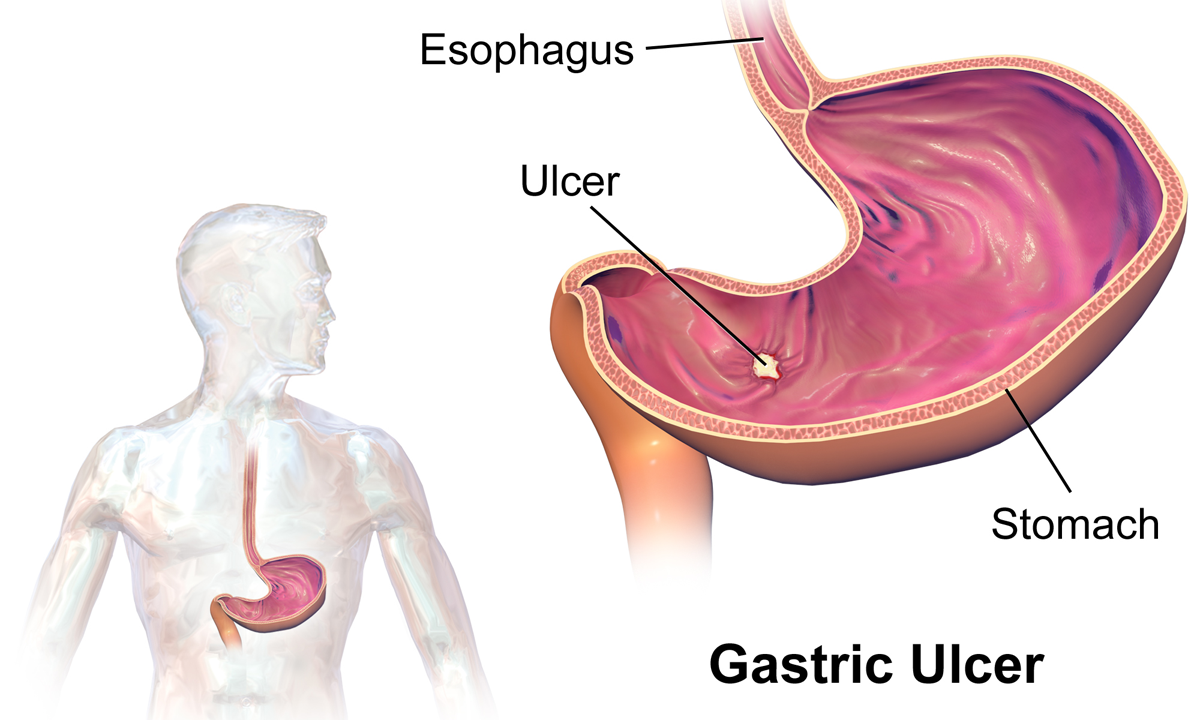
- Illustration depicting peptic ulcer disease, also known as a gastric ulcer
- Specialty: Gastroenterology; General surgery
- Symptoms: Heartburn, upper abdominal pain, nausea, belching, vomiting, blood in the stool, weight loss, weight gain, bloating, loss of appetite, yellowing of the skin and whites of the eyes, difficulty swallowing
- Complications: Bleeding, perforation, ulcer perforation, blockage of the stomach
- Causes: Helicobacter pylori bacteria, non-steroidal anti-inflammatory drugs (NSAIDs), tobacco smoking, Crohn's disease
- Diagnostic method: Based on symptoms, confirmed by endoscopy or barium swallow
- Differential diagnosis: Stomach cancer, coronary heart disease, inflammation of the stomach lining, gallbladder inflammation
- Treatment: Medications, stopping NSAIDs, stopping smoking, stopping alcohol consumption
- Medication: Proton pump inhibitor, H2 blocker, antibiotics
- Frequency: 87.4 million (2015)
- Deaths: 267,500 (2015)

Peptic Ulcer Disease or PUD refers to damage of the inner part of the stomach's gastric mucosa (lining of the stomach), the first part of the small intestine, or sometimes the lower esophagus. An ulcer in the stomach is called a gastric ulcer, while one in the first part of the intestines is a duodenal ulcer. The most common symptoms of a duodenal ulcer are waking at night with upper abdominal pain, and upper abdominal pain that improves with eating. With a gastric ulcer, the pain may worsen with eating. The pain is often described as a burning or dull ache. Other symptoms include belching, vomiting, weight loss, or poor appetite. About a third of older people with peptic ulcers have no symptoms. Complications may include bleeding, perforation, and blockage of the stomach. Bleeding occurs in as many as 15% of cases.

Common causes include infection with Helicobacter pylori and excessive use of non-steroidal anti-inflammatory drugs (NSAIDs). Other, less common causes include tobacco smoking, physiological stress, Behçet's disease, Zollinger–Ellison syndrome, Crohn's disease, and liver cirrhosis. Older people are more sensitive to the ulcer-causing effects of NSAIDs. The diagnosis is typically suspected due to the presenting symptoms with confirmation by either endoscopy or barium swallow. H. pylori can be diagnosed by testing the blood for antibodies, a urea breath test, testing the stool for signs of the bacteria, or a biopsy of the stomach. Other conditions that produce similar symptoms include stomach cancer, coronary heart disease, and inflammation of the stomach lining or gallbladder inflammation.

Diet does not play an important role in either causing or preventing ulcers. Treatment includes stopping smoking, stopping use of NSAIDs, stopping alcohol, and taking medications to decrease stomach acid. The medication used to decrease acid is usually either a proton pump inhibitor (PPI) or an H2 blocker, with four weeks of treatment initially recommended. Ulcers due to H. pylori are treated with a combination of medications, such as amoxicillin, clarithromycin, and a PPI. Increasing antibiotic resistance can make this treatment less effective. Bleeding ulcers may be treated by endoscopy, with open surgery typically only used in cases in which it is not successful.

Peptic ulcers are present in around 4% of the population. New ulcers were found in around 87.4 million people worldwide during 2015. About 10% of people develop a peptic ulcer at some point in their life. Peptic ulcers resulted in 267,500 deaths in 2015, down from 327,000 in 1990. The first description of a perforated peptic ulcer was in 1670, in Princess Henrietta of England. H. pylori was first identified as causing peptic ulcers by Barry Marshall and Robin Warren in the late 20th century, a discovery for which they received the Nobel Prize in 2005.

== Signs and symptoms ==
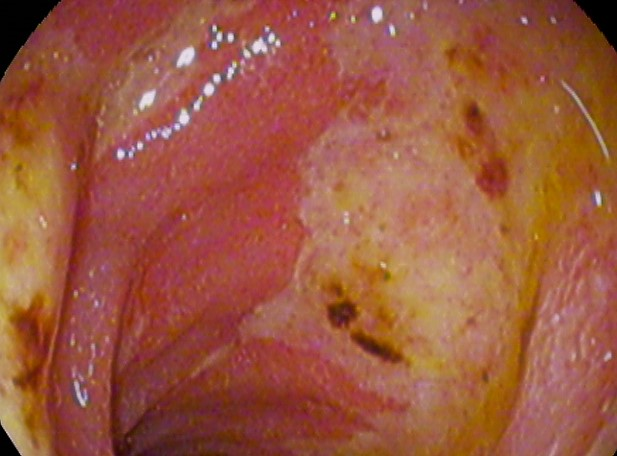
Duodenal ulcer A2 stage, acute duodenal mucosal lesion (ADML)

Signs and symptoms of a peptic ulcer can include one or more of the following:

- abdominal pain, classically epigastric, strongly correlated with mealtimes. In cases of duodenal ulcers, pain occurs about 3 hours after a meal and wakes the person from sleep.
- bloating and abdominal fullness;
- waterbrash (a rush of saliva after an episode of regurgitation to dilute the acid in the esophagus, although this is more associated with gastroesophageal reflux disease);
- nausea and copious vomiting;
- loss of appetite and weight loss, in gastric ulcer;
- weight gain, in duodenal ulcer, as the pain is relieved by eating;
- hematemesis (vomiting of blood); this can occur due to bleeding directly from a gastric ulcer or from damage to the esophagus from severe/continuing vomiting.
- melena (tarry, foul-smelling feces due to presence of oxidized iron from hemoglobin);
- rarely, an ulcer can lead to a gastric or duodenal perforation, which leads to acute peritonitis and extreme, stabbing pain, and requires immediate surgery.

A history of heartburn or gastroesophageal reflux disease (GERD) and use of certain medications can raise the suspicion of a peptic ulcer. Medicines associated with peptic ulcer include NSAIDs (non-steroidal anti-inflammatory drugs) that inhibit cyclooxygenase and most glucocorticoids (e.g., dexamethasone and prednisolone).

In people over the age of 45 with more than two weeks of the above symptoms, the odds for peptic ulceration are high enough to warrant rapid investigation by esophagogastroduodenoscopy.

The timing of symptoms in relation to the meal may differentiate between gastric and duodenal ulcers. A gastric ulcer would give epigastric pain during the meal, associated with nausea and vomiting, as gastric acid production is increased as food enters the stomach. Pain in duodenal ulcers would be aggravated by hunger and relieved by a meal, and is associated with night pain.

Also, the symptoms of peptic ulcers may vary with the location of the ulcer and the person's age. Furthermore, typical ulcers tend to heal and recur, and as a result, the pain may occur for a few days and weeks and then wane or disappear. Usually, children and the elderly do not develop any symptoms unless complications have arisen.

A burning or gnawing feeling in the stomach area lasting between 30 minutes and 3 hours commonly accompanies ulcers. This pain can be misinterpreted as hunger, indigestion, or heartburn. Pain is usually caused by the ulcer, but it may be aggravated by the stomach acid when it comes into contact with the ulcerated area. The pain caused by peptic ulcers can be felt anywhere from the navel up to the sternum. It may last from a few minutes to several hours, and it may be worse when the stomach is empty. Also, sometimes the pain may flare at night, and it can commonly be temporarily relieved by eating foods that buffer stomach acid or by taking anti-acid medication. However, peptic ulcer disease symptoms may be different for everyone.

=== Complications ===
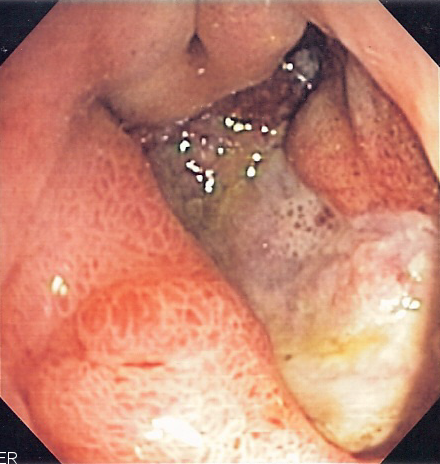
An endoscopic image showing deep gastric ulcer.

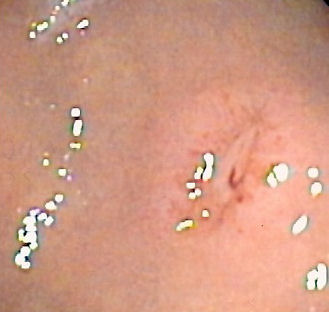
Endoscopic image of a small gastric ulcer with visible blood vessels, a potential warning sign for upper gastrointestinal bleeding

- Gastrointestinal bleeding is the most common complication. Sudden large bleeding can be life-threatening. It is associated with 5% to 10% death rate.
- Perforation (a hole in the wall of the gastrointestinal tract) following a gastric ulcer often leads to catastrophic consequences if left untreated. Erosion of the gastrointestinal wall by the ulcer leads to spillage of the stomach or intestinal contents into the abdominal cavity, leading to an acute chemical peritonitis. The first sign is often sudden intense abdominal pain, as seen in Valentino's syndrome. Posterior gastric wall perforation may lead to bleeding due to the involvement of the gastroduodenal artery that lies posterior to the first part of the duodenum. The death rate in this case is 20%.
- Penetration is a form of perforation in which the hole leads to, and the ulcer continues into adjacent organs such as the liver and pancreas.
- Gastric outlet obstruction (stenosis) is a narrowing of the pyloric canal by scarring and swelling of the gastric antrum and duodenum due to peptic ulcers. The person often presents with severe vomiting.
- Helicobacter pylori makes ulcers 3 to 6 times more likely to become cancer. Biopsies are used to determine if an ulcer is cancerous. The risk for developing gastrointestinal cancer also appears to be slightly higher with gastric ulcers.

== Cause ==
=== H. pylori ===
Helicobacter pylori is one of the major causative factors of peptic ulcer disease. It secretes urease to create an alkaline environment, which is suitable for its survival. It expresses blood group antigen-binding adhesin (BabA) and outer inflammatory protein adhesin (OipA), which enables it to attach to the gastric epithelium. The bacterium also expresses virulence factors such as CagA and PicB, which cause stomach mucosal inflammation. The VacA gene encodes for vacuolating cytotoxin, but its mechanism of causing peptic ulcers is unclear. Such stomach mucosal inflammation can be associated with hyperchlorhydria (increased stomach acid secretion) or hypochlorhydria (reduced stomach acid secretion). Inflammatory cytokines inhibit the parietal cell acid secretion. H. pylori also secretes certain products that inhibit hydrogen potassium ATPase; activate calcitonin gene-related peptide sensory neurons, which increases somatostatin secretion to inhibit acid production by parietal cells; and inhibit gastrin secretion. This reduction in acid production causes gastric ulcers. On the other hand, increased acid production at the pyloric antrum is associated with duodenal ulcers in 10% to 15% of H. pylori infection cases. In this case, somatostatin production is reduced, and gastrin production is increased, leading to increased histamine secretion from the enterochromaffin cells, thus increasing acid production. An acidic environment in the antrum causes metaplasia of the duodenal cells, causing duodenal ulcers.

Human immune response toward the bacteria also determines the emergence of peptic ulcer disease. The human IL1B gene encodes for Interleukin 1 beta, and other genes that encode for tumour necrosis factor (TNF) and Lymphotoxin alpha also play a role in gastric inflammation.

=== NSAIDs ===
Taking nonsteroidal anti-inflammatory drugs (NSAIDs) such as aspirin can increase the risk of peptic ulcer disease by four times compared to non-users. The risk of getting a peptic ulcer is two times for aspirin users. Risk of bleeding increases if NSAIDs are combined with selective serotonin reuptake inhibitor (SSRI), corticosteroids, antimineralocorticoids, and anticoagulants. The gastric mucosa protects itself from gastric acid with a layer of mucus, the secretion of which is stimulated by certain prostaglandins. NSAIDs block the function of cyclooxygenase 1 (COX-1), which is essential for the production of these prostaglandins. Besides this, NSAIDs also inhibit stomach mucosa cells' proliferation and mucosal blood flow, reducing bicarbonate and mucus secretion, which reduces the integrity of the mucosa. Another type of NSAIDs, called COX-2 selective anti-inflammatory drugs (such as celecoxib), preferentially inhibit COX-2, which is less essential in the gastric mucosa. This reduces the probability of getting peptic ulcers; however, it can still delay ulcer healing for those who already have a peptic ulcer. Peptic ulcers caused by NSAIDs differ from those caused by H. pylori as the latter's appear as a consequence of inflammation of the mucosa (presence of neutrophil and submucosal edema), the former instead as a consequence of a direct damage of the NSAID molecule against COX enzymes, altering the hydrophobic state of the mucus, the permeability of the lining epithelium and mitochondrial machinery of the cell itself. In this way, NSAID ulcers tend to complicate faster and dig deeper in the tissue, causing more complications – often asymptomatically – until a great portion of the tissue is involved.

=== Stress ===
Physiological (not psychological) stress due to serious health problems, such as those requiring treatment in an intensive care unit, is well described as a cause of peptic ulcers, which are also known as stress ulcers.

While chronic life stress was once believed to be the main cause of ulcers, this is no longer the case. It is, however, still occasionally believed to play a role. This may be due to the well-documented effects of stress on gastric physiology, increasing the risk in those with other causes, such as H. pylori or NSAID use.

=== Diet ===
Dietary factors, such as spice consumption, were hypothesized to cause ulcers until the late 20th century, but have been shown to be of relatively minor importance. Caffeine and coffee, also commonly thought to cause or exacerbate ulcers, appear to have little effect. Similarly, while studies have found that alcohol consumption increases risk when associated with H. pylori infection, it does not seem to increase risk independently. Even when coupled with H. pylori infection, the increase is modest in comparison to the primary risk factor. (Note: Sonnenberg in his study cautiously concludes that, among other potential factors that were found to correlate to ulcer healing, "moderate alcohol intake might [also] favor ulcer healing." (p. 1066))

=== Other ===
Other causes of peptic ulcer disease include gastric ischaemia, drugs, metabolic disturbances, cytomegalovirus (CMV), upper abdominal radiotherapy, Crohn's disease, and vasculitis. Gastrinomas (Zollinger–Ellison syndrome), or rare gastrin-secreting tumors, also cause multiple and difficult-to-heal ulcers.

It is still unclear whether smoking increases the risk of getting peptic ulcers.

== Diagnosis ==
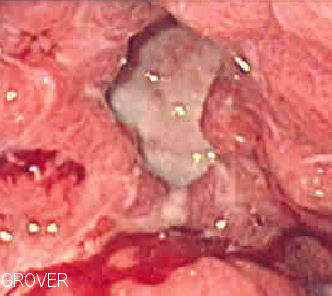
Endoscopic image of gastric ulcer, biopsy proven to be gastric cancer.

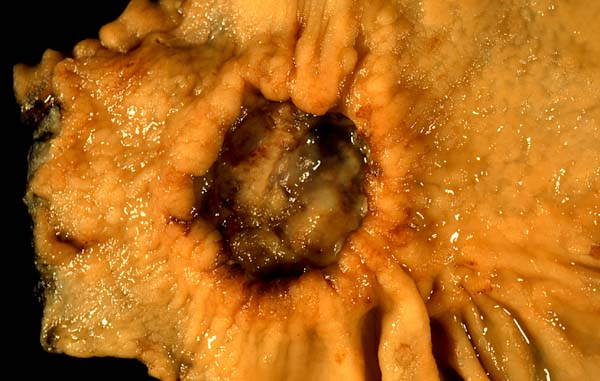
A biopsy sample of a stomach ulcer that was diagnosed as stomach cancer

The diagnosis is mainly established based on the characteristic symptoms. Stomach pain is the most common sign of a peptic ulcer.

More specifically, peptic ulcers erode the muscularis mucosae, at minimum reaching to the level of the submucosa (contrast with erosions, which do not involve the muscularis mucosae).

Confirmation of the diagnosis is made with the help of tests such as endoscopies or barium contrast x-rays. The tests are typically ordered if the symptoms do not resolve after a few weeks of treatment, or when they first appear in a person who is over age 45 or who has other symptoms such as weight loss, because stomach cancer can cause similar symptoms. Also, when severe ulcers resist treatment, particularly if a person has several ulcers or the ulcers are in unusual places, a doctor may suspect an underlying condition that causes the stomach to overproduce acid.

An esophagogastroduodenoscopy (EGD), a form of endoscopy, also known as a gastroscopy, is carried out on people in whom a peptic ulcer is suspected. It is also the gold standard of diagnosis for peptic ulcer disease. By direct visual identification, the location and severity of an ulcer can be described. Moreover, if no ulcer is present, EGD can often provide an alternative diagnosis.

One of the reasons that blood tests are not reliable for accurate peptic ulcer diagnosis on their own is their inability to differentiate between past exposure to the bacteria and current infection. Additionally, a false negative result is possible with a blood test if the person has recently been taking certain drugs, such as antibiotics or proton-pump inhibitors.

The diagnosis of Helicobacter pylori can be made by:

- Urea breath test (noninvasive and does not require EGD);
- Direct culture from an EGD biopsy specimen; this is difficult and can be expensive. Most labs are not set up to perform H. pylori cultures;
- Direct detection of urease activity in a biopsy specimen by rapid urease test;
- Measurement of antibody levels in the blood (does not require EGD). It is still somewhat controversial whether a positive antibody test without EGD is enough to warrant eradication therapy.
- Stool antigen test;
- Histological examination and staining of an EGD biopsy.

The breath test uses radioactive carbon to detect H. pylori. To perform this exam, the person is asked to drink a tasteless liquid that contains the carbon as part of the substance that the bacteria break down. After an hour, the person is asked to blow into a sealed bag. If the person is infected with H. pylori, the breath sample will contain radioactive carbon dioxide. This test provides the advantage of being able to monitor the response to the treatment used to kill the bacteria.

The possibility of other causes of ulcers, notably malignancy (gastric cancer), needs to be kept in mind. This is especially true in ulcers of the greater curvature of the stomach; most are also a consequence of chronic H. pylori infection.

If a peptic ulcer perforates, air will leak from inside the gastrointestinal tract (which always contains some air) to the peritoneal cavity (which normally never contains air). This leads to "free gas" within the peritoneal cavity. If the person stands, as when having a chest X-ray, the gas will float to a position underneath the diaphragm. Therefore, gas in the peritoneal cavity, shown on an erect chest X-ray or supine lateral abdominal X-ray, is an omen of perforated peptic ulcer disease.

=== Classification ===
1. Esophagus; 2. Stomach; 3. Ulcers; 4. Duodenum; 5. Mucosa; 6. Submucosa; 7. Muscle

Peptic ulcers are a form of acid–peptic disorder. Peptic ulcers can be classified according to their location and other factors.

==== By location ====
- Duodenum (called duodenal ulcer)
- Esophagus (called esophageal ulcer)
- Stomach (called gastric ulcer)
- Meckel's diverticulum (called Meckel's diverticulum ulcer; is very tender with palpation)

==== Modified Johnson ====
- Type I: Ulcer along the body of the stomach, most often along the lesser curve at incisura angularis along the locus minoris resistantiae. Not associated with acid hypersecretion.
- Type II: Ulcer in the body in combination with duodenal ulcers. Associated with acid oversecretion.
- Type III: In the pyloric channel within 3 cm of pylorus. Associated with acid oversecretion.
- Type IV: Proximal gastroesophageal ulcer.
- Type V: Can occur throughout the stomach. Associated with the chronic use of NSAIDs (such as ibuprofen).

=== Macroscopic appearance ===
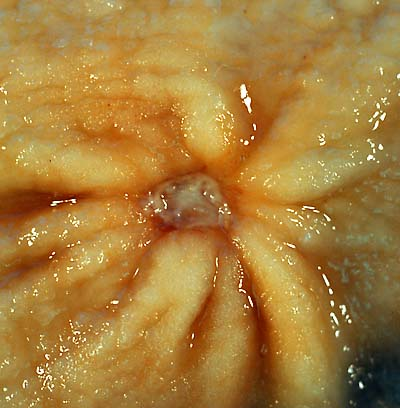
A benign gastric ulcer (from the antrum) of a gastrectomy specimen.

Gastric ulcers are most often localized on the lesser curvature of the stomach. The ulcer is a round to oval parietal defect ("hole"), 2–4 cm diameter, with a smooth base and perpendicular borders. These borders are not elevated or irregular in the acute form of peptic ulcer, and regular but with elevated borders and an inflammatory surrounding in the chronic form. In the ulcerative form of gastric cancer, the borders are irregular. Surrounding mucosa may present radial folds as a consequence of the parietal scarring.

=== Microscopic appearance ===
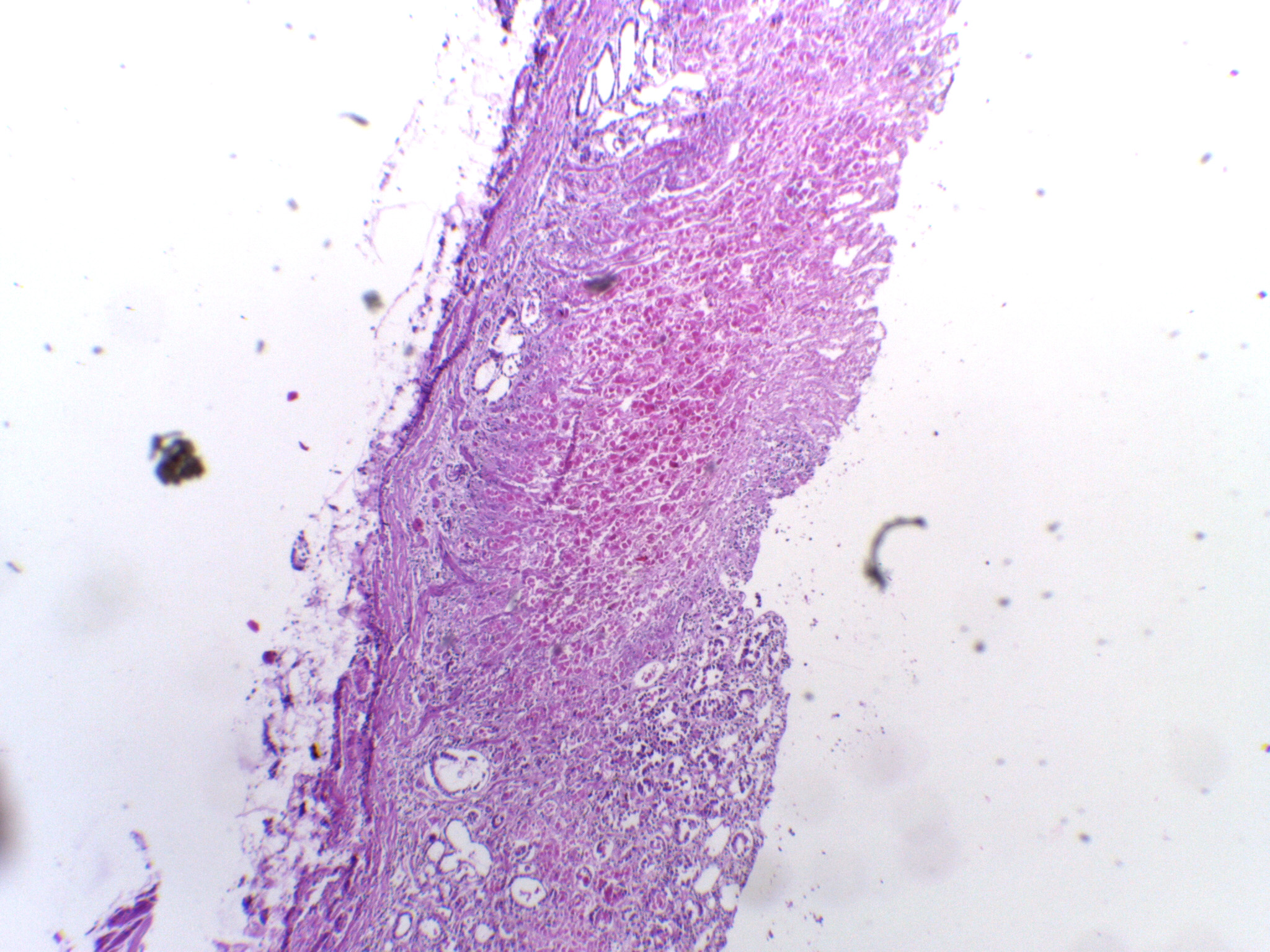
Micrograph showing erosive gastric ulcer. (H&E stain)

A gastric peptic ulcer is a mucosal perforation that penetrates the muscularis mucosae and lamina propria, usually produced by acid-pepsin aggression. Ulcer margins are perpendicular and present chronic gastritis. During the active phase, the base of the ulcer shows four zones: fibrinoid necrosis, inflammatory exudate, granulation tissue, and fibrous tissue. The fibrous base of the ulcer may contain vessels with a thickened wall or with thrombosis.

=== Differential diagnosis ===
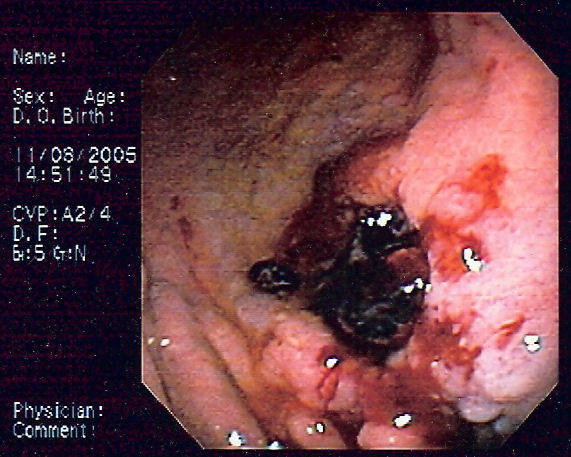
Endoscopic image of gastric MALT lymphoma taken in body of stomach in patient who presented with upper GI hemorrhage. Appearance is similar to gastric ulcer with adherent clot.

Conditions that may appear similar include:

- Gastritis
- Stomach cancer
- Gastroesophageal reflux disease
- Pancreatitis
- Hepatic congestion
- Cholecystitis
- Biliary colic
- Inferior myocardial infarction
- Referred pain (pleurisy, pericarditis)
- Superior mesenteric artery syndrome
- Gastric lymphoma

== Prevention ==
Prevention of peptic ulcer disease for those who are taking NSAIDs (with low cardiovascular risk) can be achieved by adding a proton pump inhibitor (PPI), an H2 antagonist, or misoprostol. NSAIDs of the COX-2 inhibitor type may reduce the rate of ulcers when compared to non-selective NSAIDs. PPI is the most popular agent in peptic ulcer prevention. However, there is no evidence that H2 antagonists can prevent stomach bleeding for those taking NSAIDs. Although misoprostol is effective in preventing peptic ulcers, its properties of promoting abortion and causing gastrointestinal distress limit its use. For those with high cardiovascular risk, naproxen with PPI can be a useful choice. Otherwise, low-dose aspirin, celecoxib, and PPI can also be used.

== Management ==
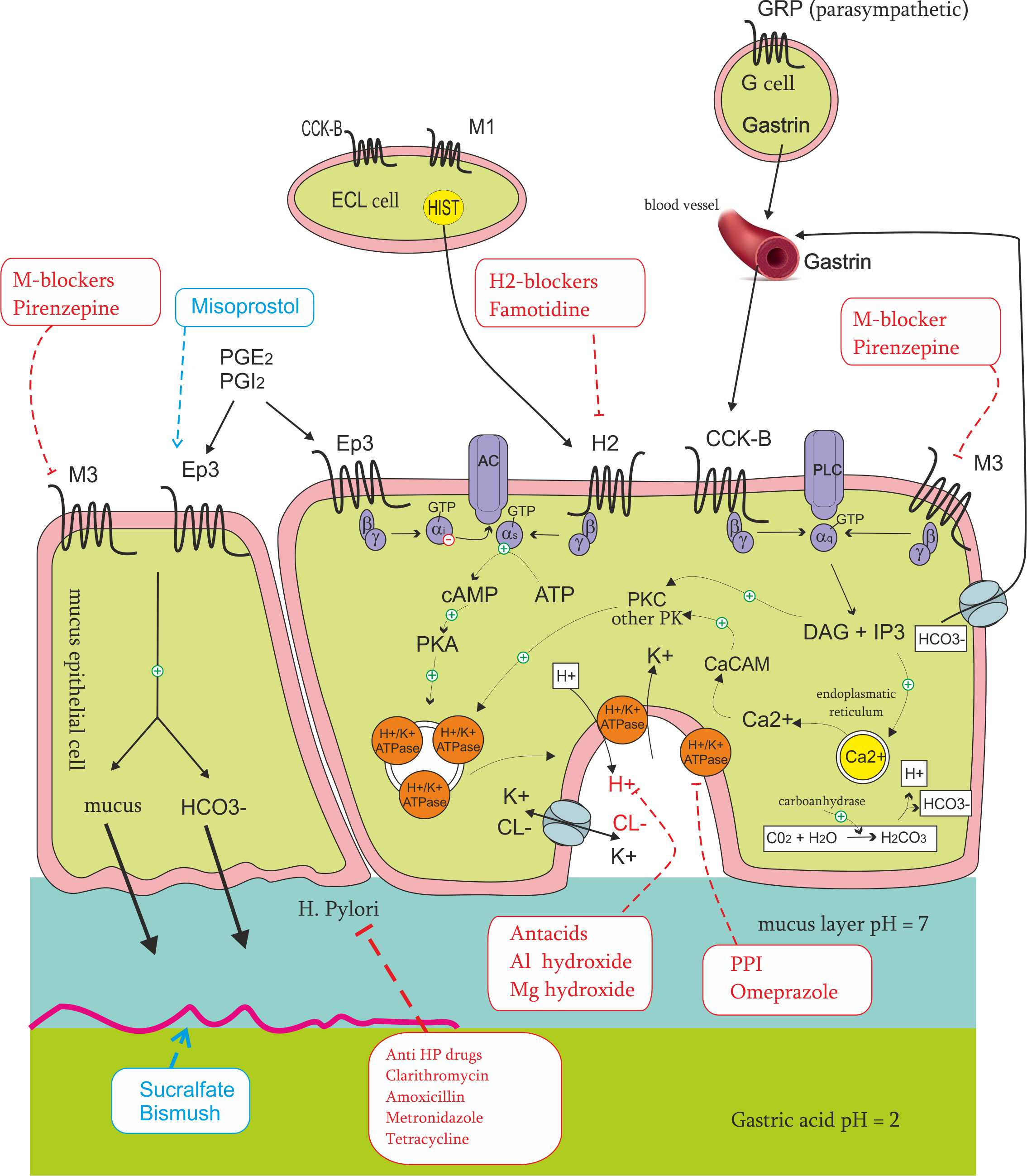
Peptic ulcer treatment: pharmacology of drugs

=== Eradication therapy ===
Once the diagnosis of H. pylori is confirmed, the first-line treatment would be a triple regimen in which pantoprazole and clarithromycin are combined with either amoxicillin or metronidazole. This treatment regimen can be given for 7–14 days. However, its effectiveness in eradicating H. pylori has been reducing from 90% to 70%. However, the rate of eradication can be increased by doubling the dosage of pantoprazole or increasing the duration of treatment to 14 days. Quadruple therapy (pantoprazole, clarithromycin, amoxicillin, and metronidazole) can also be used. The quadruple therapy can achieve an eradication rate of 90%. If the clarithromycin resistance rate is higher than 15% in an area, the usage of clarithromycin should be abandoned. Instead, bismuth-containing quadruple therapy can be used (pantoprazole, bismuth citrate, tetracycline, and metronidazole) for 14 days. The bismuth therapy can also achieve an eradication rate of 90% and can be used as second-line therapy when the first-line triple-regimen therapy has failed.

=== NSAIDs-induced ulcers ===
NSAID-associated ulcers heal in six to eight weeks, provided the NSAIDs are withdrawn with the introduction of proton pump inhibitors (PPI).

=== Bleeding ===
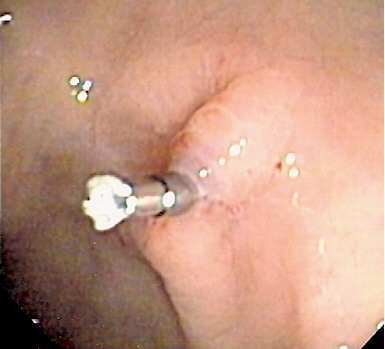
Endoscopic clipping placed on a gastric ulcer at risk for bleeding

For those with bleeding peptic ulcers, fluid replacement with crystalloids is sometimes given to maintain volume in the blood vessels. Maintaining haemoglobin at greater than 7 g/dL (70 g/L) through restrictive blood transfusion has been associated with a reduced rate of death. Glasgow-Blatchford score is used to determine whether a person should be treated inside a hospital or as an outpatient. Intravenous PPIs can suppress stomach bleeding more quickly than oral ones. A neutral stomach pH is required to keep platelets in place and prevent clot lysis. Tranexamic acid and antifibrinolytic agents are not useful in treating peptic ulcer disease.

Early endoscopic therapy can help to stop bleeding by using cautery, endoclip, or epinephrine injection. Treatment is indicated if there is active bleeding in the stomach, visible vessels, or an adherent clot. Endoscopy is also helpful in identifying people who are suitable for hospital discharge. Prokinetic agents such as erythromycin and metoclopramide can be given before endoscopy to improve the endoscopic view. Either high- or low-dose PPIs are equally effective in reducing bleeding after endoscopy. High-dose intravenous PPI is defined as a bolus dose of 80 mg followed by an infusion of 8 mg per hour for 72 hours—in other words, the continuous infusion of PPI of greater than 192 mg per day. Intravenous PPI can be changed to oral once there is no high risk of rebleeding from a peptic ulcer.

For those with hypovolemic shock and ulcer size of greater than 2 cm, there is a high chance that the endoscopic treatment would fail. Therefore, surgery and angiographic embolism are reserved for these complicated cases. However, there is a higher rate of complications for those who underwent surgery to patch the stomach bleeding site when compared to repeated endoscopy. Angiographic embolisation has a higher rebleeding rate but a similar rate of death to surgery.

=== Anticoagulants ===
According to expert opinion, for those who are already on anticoagulants, the international normalized ratio (INR) should be kept at 1.5. For aspirin users who required endoscopic treatment for bleeding peptic ulcer, there is a two times increased risk of rebleeding but with a ten times reduced risk of death at eight weeks following the resumption of aspirin. For those who were on double antiplatelet agents for an indwelling stent in blood vessels, both antiplatelet agents should not be stopped because there is a high risk of stent thrombosis. For those who were under warfarin treatment, fresh frozen plasma (FFP), vitamin K, prothrombin complex concentrates, or recombinant factor VIIa can be given to reverse the effect of warfarin. High doses of vitamin K should be avoided to reduce the time for rewarfarinisation once the stomach bleeding has stopped. Prothrombin complex concentrates are preferred for severe bleeding. Recombinant factor VIIa is reserved for life-threatening bleeding because of its high risk of thromboembolism. Direct oral anticoagulants (DOAC) are recommended instead of warfarin as they are more effective in preventing thromboembolism. In case of bleeding caused by DOAC, activated charcoal within four hours is the antidote of choice.

== Epidemiology ==
Deaths from peptic ulcer disease per million persons in 2012 0–7 8–11 12–16 17–19 20–25 26–32 33–40 41–53 54–72 73–132

Disability-adjusted life year for peptic ulcer disease per 100,000 inhabitants in 2004 (WHO, 2009). no data less than 20 20–40 40–60 60–80 80–100 100–120 120–140 140–160 160–180 180–200 200–220 more than 220

The lifetime risk for developing a peptic ulcer is approximately 5% to 10% with the rate of 0.1% to 0.3% per year. Peptic ulcers resulted in 301,000 deaths in 2013, down from 327,000 in 1990.

In Western countries, the percentage of people with H. pylori infections roughly matches age (i.e., 20% at age 20, 30% at age 30, 80% at age 80, etc.). Prevalence is higher in third-world countries, where it is estimated at 70% of the population, whereas developed countries show a maximum of a 40% ratio. Overall, H. pylori infections show a worldwide decrease, more so in developed countries. Transmission occurs via food, contaminated groundwater, or human saliva (such as from kissing or sharing food utensils).

Peptic ulcer disease had a tremendous effect on morbidity and mortality until the last decades of the 20th century, when epidemiological trends started to point to an impressive fall in its incidence. The reason that the rates of peptic ulcer disease decreased is thought to be the development of new effective medication and acid suppressants and the rational use of nonsteroidal anti-inflammatory drugs (NSAIDs).

== History ==
John Lykoudis, a general practitioner in Greece, treated people for peptic ulcer disease with antibiotics beginning in 1958, long before it was commonly recognized that bacteria were a dominant cause for the disease.

Helicobacter pylori was identified in 1982 by two Australian scientists, Robin Warren and Barry J. Marshall, as a causative factor for ulcers. In their original paper, Warren and Marshall contended that most gastric ulcers and gastritis were caused by colonization with this bacterium, not by stress or spicy food, as had been assumed before.

The H. pylori hypothesis was still poorly received, so in an act of self-experimentation Marshall drank a Petri dish containing a culture of organisms extracted from a person with an ulcer and five days later developed gastritis. His symptoms disappeared after two weeks, but he took antibiotics to kill the remaining bacteria at the urging of his wife, since halitosis is one of the symptoms of infection. This experiment was published in 1984 in the Australian Medical Journal and is among the most cited articles from the journal.

In 1997, the Centers for Disease Control and Prevention, with other government agencies, academic institutions, and industry, launched a national education campaign to inform health care providers and consumers about the link between H. pylori and ulcers. This campaign reinforced the news that ulcers are a curable infection and that health can be greatly improved and money saved by disseminating information about H. pylori.

In 2005, the Karolinska Institute in Stockholm awarded the Nobel Prize in Physiology or Medicine to Marshall and his long-time collaborator Warren "for their discovery of the bacterium Helicobacter pylori and its role in gastritis and peptic ulcer disease." Marshall continues research related to H. pylori and runs a molecular biology lab at UWA in Perth, Western Australia.

A 1998 New England Medical Journal study found that mastic gum, a tree resin extract, actively eliminated the H. pylori bacteria. However, multiple subsequent studies (in mice and in vivo) have found no effect of using mastic gum on reducing H. pylori levels.
