= Cystogastrostomy =

- Specialty: Gastroenterology

Cystogastrostomy is a surgery to create an opening between a pancreatic pseudocyst and the stomach when the cyst is in a suitable position to be drained into the stomach. This conserves pancreatic juices that would otherwise be lost. This surgery is performed by a pancreatic surgeon to avoid a life-threatening rupture of the pancreatic pseudocyst.

== Indications ==
Symptomatic pancreatic pseudocysts are an indication a cystogastrostomy needs to be performed. Pancreatic pseudocysts are chronic collections of pancreatic fluid encased by a wall of nonepithelialized granulation tissue and fibrosis. They can be caused by leakage of the pancreatic duct, or as a result of inflammatory pancreatitis. Symptoms of this include abdominal bloating, difficulty eating and digesting food, and constant pain or deep ache in the abdomen. A lump can be felt in the middle or left upper abdomen if a pseudocyst is present. To further diagnose a pancreatic pseudocyst an abdominal CT scan, MRI or ultrasound can be used. Emergency surgery may need to be performed if there is a rupture of the pseudocyst. This can be detected from symptoms of bleeding, shock, fainting, fever and chills, rapid heartbeat, or severe abdominal pain.

== Technique ==
=== Surgical cystogastrostomy ===
Surgical repair is carried out through an incision in the abdomen. After locating the pseudocyst, it is attached to the wall of the stomach and the cystogastrostomy is created. Although it has a high success rate, it is infrequently used because of the recovery period.

=== Endoscopic cystogastrostomy ===
A relatively new and less-invasive method involving endoscopic ultrasound (EUS) guidance and fluoroscopy. A large bore needle is used to access the identified pseudocyst, creating a fistula between the cystic cavity and either the stomach or the duodenum. Plastic stents may be placed to facilitate drainage from the pseudocyst. The success rate of endoscopic treatment of pseudocysts may be greater than 70%.

=== Laparoscopic cystogastrostomy ===
This method is the second of two less invasive surgeries used to drain pseudocysts and can be performed by a single surgeon because of the advanced tools. The pseudocyst is identified and accessed using laparoscopic techniques. Once the pseudocyst cavity is located, it is entered and aspirated, and an opening is created into the stomach for drainage. Laparoscopic drainage may result in better cosmetic appearance and decreased pain following surgery.

== Complications ==
Cystogastrostomy can lead to pancreatic abscess and pancreatic duct leak. Stents can become blocked, leading to infection of the pseudocyst. Other complications include those normally associated with surgery and anesthesia, including bleeding.

== History ==
Jedlicka first described the procedure.
