= Rockall score =

System for assessing risks after gastrointestinal bleeding

- Test of: assess after GI bleeding(for adverse outcome)

Rockall risk scoring system attempts to identify patients at risk of adverse outcome following acute upper gastrointestinal bleeding. Rockall et al. identified independent risk factors in 1996 which were later shown to predict mortality accurately. The scoring system uses clinical criteria (increasing age, co-morbidity, shock) as well as endoscopic finding (diagnosis, stigmata of acute bleeding). It is named for Professor Tim Rockall, who was the main investigator and first author of the studies that led to its formulation. A convenient mnemonic is ABCDE - i.e. Age, Blood pressure fall (shock), Co-morbidity, Diagnosis and Evidence of bleeding.

Variable	Score 0	Score 1	Score 2	Score 3
Age	<60	60- 79	>80	
Shock	No shock	Pulse >100; BP >100 Systolic	SBP <100	
Co-morbidity	Nil major		CHF, IHD, major morbidity	kidney failure, liver failure, metastatic cancer
Diagnosis	Mallory-Weiss	All other diagnoses	GI malignancy	
Evidence of bleeding on endoscopy	None		Blood, adherent clot, spurting vessel	

== Interpretation ==
Total score is calculated by simple addition. A score less than 3 carries good prognosis but total score more than 8 carries high risk of mortality.

== See also ==
- Forrest classification
- Glasgow-Blatchford score
