= CT gastrography =

CT Gastrography
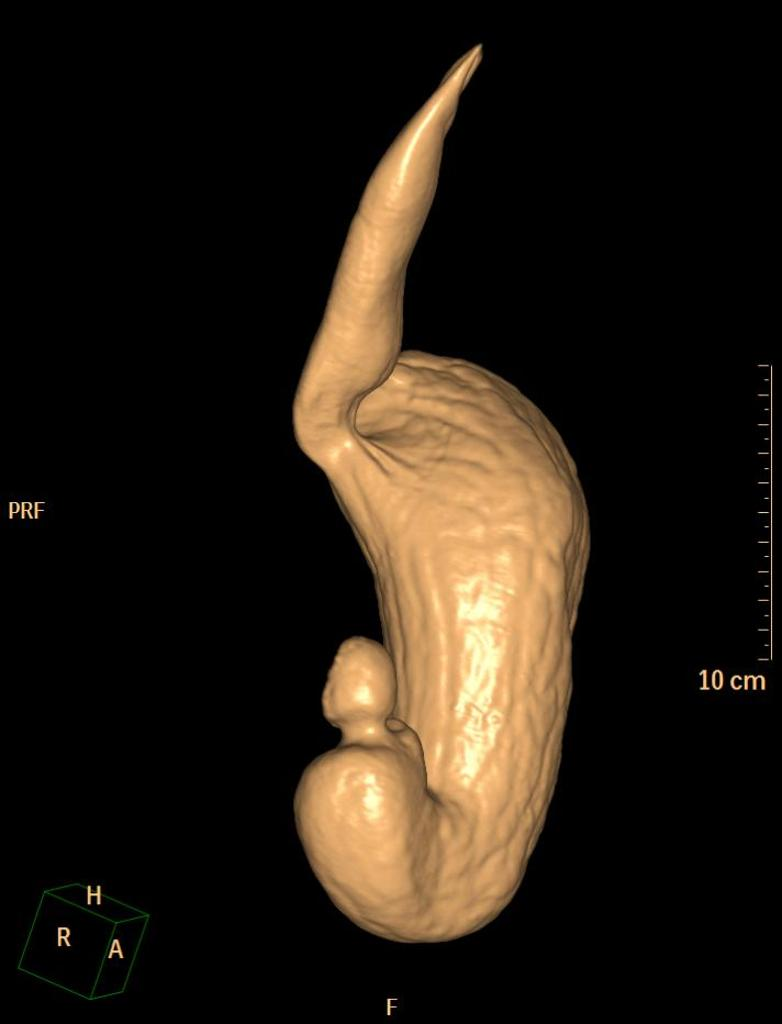
- Normal CT Virtual gastroscopy
- Purpose: is noninvasive procedure for detection of gastric abnormalities

Computed tomographic (CT) gastrography, also called virtual gastroscopy (VG), is a noninvasive procedure for the detection of gastric abnormalities. Multiple X-rays are used to create a 3-Dimensional image of the organ, allowing abnormalities to be detected.

== Advantages ==
- rapid and noninvasive
- identifies local tumor invasion, lymph node and metastasis in cases of gastric cancer

== Indications ==
- preoperative planning for gastric carcinoma
- to examine gastric abnormalities, e.g. hiatus hernia, polyps and ulcers
- post-surgical assessment of the stomach

== Technique ==
- Patient fasts at least 8 hours before the exam.
- Bowel distension, optimal gastric distention is a fundamental prerequisite for CT gastrography data evaluation; collapsed gastric wall may mimic disease or obscure underlying pathology.
- Negative oral contrast medium with effervescent granules is effective for optimal gastric distension.

=== Data acquisition and analysis ===
- CT scanning is ideally performed on a multi-detector computed tomography (MDCT) with a thin collimation.
- Data interpretation with the use of two-dimensional (2D) and three-dimensional (3D) displays for proper evaluation

== See also ==
- CT examinations
