= Upper gastrointestinal bleeding =

Bleeding of the esophagus, stomach, or upper intestine

- Other names: Upper gastrointestinal hemorrhage, gastrorrhagia
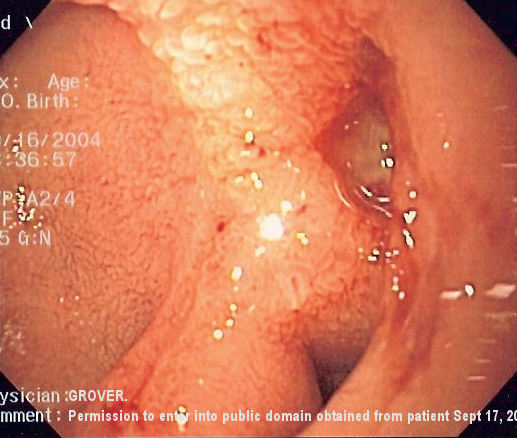
- Endoscopic image of a posterior wall duodenal ulcer with a clean base, which is a common cause of upper gastrointestinal hemorrhage.
- Specialty: Gastroenterology
- Symptoms: Hematemesis (vomiting blood), coffee ground vomiting, melena, hematochezia (maroon-coloured stool) in severe cases

Upper gastrointestinal bleeding (UGIB) is gastrointestinal bleeding in the upper gastrointestinal tract, commonly defined as bleeding arising from the esophagus, stomach, or duodenum. Blood may be observed in vomit or in altered form as black stool. Depending on the amount of the blood loss, symptoms may include shock.

Upper gastrointestinal bleeding can be caused by peptic ulcers, gastric erosions, esophageal varices, and rarer causes such as gastric cancer. The initial assessment includes measurement of the blood pressure and heart rate, as well as blood tests to determine the hemoglobin.

Significant upper gastrointestinal bleeding is considered a medical emergency. Fluid replacement, as well as blood transfusion, may be required. Endoscopy is recommended within 24 hours and bleeding can be stopped by various techniques. Proton pump inhibitors are often used. Tranexamic acid may also be useful. Procedures (such as TIPS for variceal bleeding) may be used. Recurrent or refractory bleeding may lead to need for surgery, although this has become uncommon as a result of improved endoscopic and medical treatment.

Upper gastrointestinal bleeding affects around 50 to 150 people per 100,000 a year. It represents over 50% of cases of gastrointestinal bleeding. A 1995 UK study found an estimated mortality risk of 11% in those admitted to hospital for gastrointestinal bleeding.

== Signs and symptoms ==
Persons with upper gastrointestinal bleeding often present with hematemesis, coffee ground vomiting, melena, or hematochezia (maroon-coloured stool) if the hemorrhage is severe. The presentation of bleeding depends on the amount and location of hemorrhage. A person with upper gastrointestinal bleeding may also present with complications of anemia, including chest pain, syncope, fatigue and shortness of breath.

The physical examination performed by the physician concentrates on the following things:

- Vital signs, in order to determine the severity of bleeding and the timing of intervention
- Abdominal and rectal examination, in order to determine possible causes of hemorrhage
- Assessment for portal hypertension and stigmata of chronic liver disease in order to determine if the bleeding is from a variceal source.

Laboratory findings include anemia, coagulopathy, and an elevated BUN-to-creatinine ratio.

== Causes ==
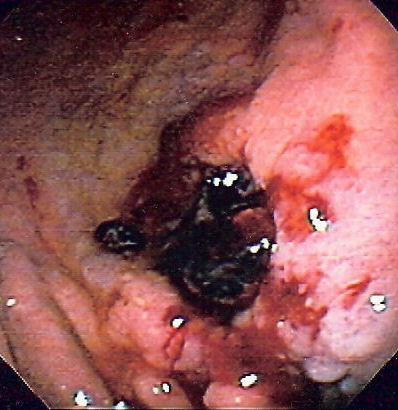
Gastric ulcer in antrum of stomach with overlying clot. Pathology was consistent with gastric lymphoma.

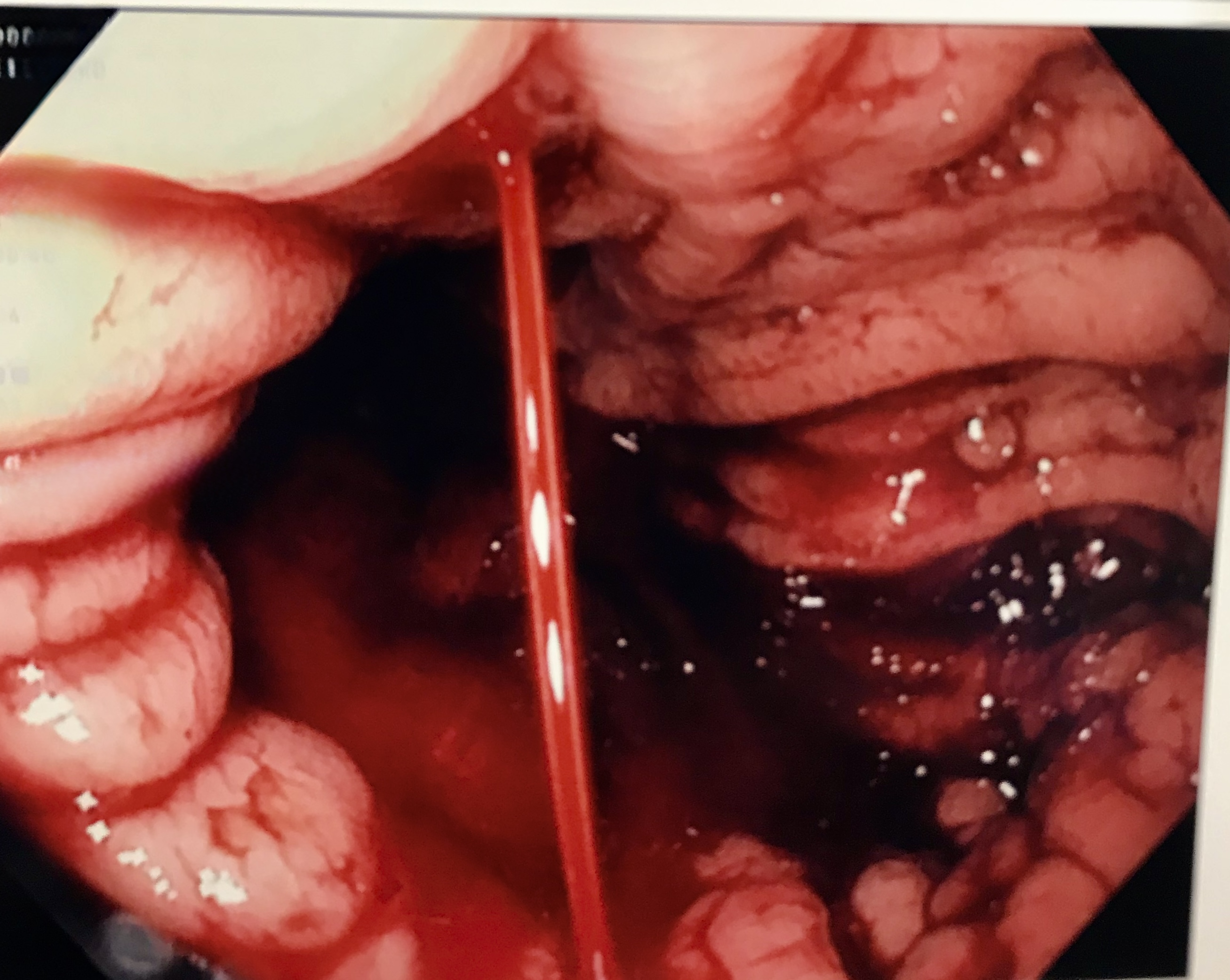
Actively bleeding Dieulafoy’s lesion in the stomach

A number of medications increase the risk of bleeding including NSAIDs and SSRIs. SSRIs double the rate of upper gastrointestinal bleeding.

There are many causes for upper gastrointestinal hemorrhage. Causes are usually anatomically divided into their location in the upper gastrointestinal tract.

People are usually stratified into having either variceal or non-variceal sources of upper gastrointestinal hemorrhage, as the two have different treatment algorithms and prognosis.

The causes for upper gastrointestinal hemorrhage include the following:

- Esophageal causes (gastrorrhagia):
  - Esophageal varices
  - Esophagitis
  - Esophageal cancer
  - Esophageal ulcers
  - Mallory-Weiss tear
- Gastric causes:
  - Gastric ulcer
  - Gastric cancer
  - Gastritis
  - Gastric varices
  - Gastric antral vascular ectasia
  - Dieulafoy's lesions
- Duodenal causes:
  - Duodenal ulcer
  - Vascular malformation, including aorto-enteric fistulae. Fistulae are usually secondary to prior vascular surgery and usually occur at the proximal anastomosis at the third or fourth portion of the duodenum where it is retroperitoneal and near the aorta.
  - Hematobilia, or bleeding from the biliary tree
  - Hemosuccus pancreaticus, or bleeding from the pancreatic duct
  - Severe superior mesenteric artery syndrome

== Diagnosis ==
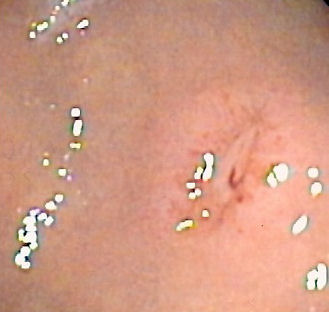
Endoscopic image of small gastric ulcer with visible blood vessels

=== Diagnostic testing ===
The strongest predictors of an upper gastrointestinal bleed are black stool, age <50 years, and blood urea nitrogen/creatinine ratio 30 or more. The diagnosis of upper gastrointestinal bleeding is assumed when hematemesis (vomiting of blood) is observed.

A nasogastric aspirate can help determine the location (source) of bleeding and help understand the best initial diagnostic and treatment plan. Nasogastric aspirate has a sensitivity of 42%, specificity 91%, negative predictive value 64%, positive predictive value 92% and overall accuracy of 66% in differentiating upper gastrointestinal bleeding from bleeding distal to the ligament of Treitz. A positive aspirate is more helpful than a negative aspirate (If the aspirate is positive, an upper gastrointestinal bleed is likely; if the aspirate is negative, the source of a gastrointestinal bleed is probably, but not certainly, lower). A smaller study found a sensitivity of 79% and specificity of 55%, somewhat opposite results from Witting. The accuracy of the aspirate is improved by using the Gastroccult test.

Determining whether blood is in gastric contents, either vomited or aspirated specimens, may be a challenge when determining the source of the hemorrhage. Slide tests are based on orthotolidine (Hematest reagent tablets and Bili-Labstix) or guaiac (Hemoccult and Gastroccult). There is some evidence that orthotolidine-based tests more sensitive than specific, the Hemoccult test's sensitivity reduced by the acidic environment; and the Gastroccult test be the most accurate.

=== Bayesian calculation ===
The predictive values cited are based on the prevalences of upper gastrointestinal bleeding in the corresponding studies. A clinical calculator can be used to generate predictive values for other prevalences.

== Treatment ==
The initial focus is on resuscitation beginning with airway management and fluid resuscitation using either intravenous fluids and or blood. A number of medications may improve outcomes depending on the source of the bleeding. Proton pump inhibitor medications are often given in the emergent setting before an endoscopy and may reduce the need for an endoscopic haemotstatic treatment. Proton pump inhibitors decrease gastric acid production. There is insufficient evidence to determine if proton pump inhibitors decrease death rates, re-bleeding events, or the need for surgical interventions. After the initial resuscitation has been completed, treatment is instigated to limit the likelihood of re-bleeds and correct any anemia that the bleeding may have caused. Those with a Glasgow Blatchford score less than 2 may not require admission to hospital.

=== Peptic ulcers ===
Based on evidence from people with other health problems crystalloid and colloids are believed to be equivalent for peptic ulcer bleeding. In people with a confirmed peptic ulcer, proton pump inhibitors do not reduce death rates, later bleeding events, or need for surgery. They may decrease signs of bleeding at endoscopy however. In those with less severe disease and where endoscopy is rapidly available, they are of less immediate clinical importance. Tranexamic acid might be effective to reduce mortality, but the evidence for this is weak. But the evidence is promising. Somatostatin and octreotide while recommended for variceal bleeding have not been found to be of general use for non-variceal bleeds.

=== Variceal bleeding ===
For initial fluid replacement colloids or albumin is preferred in people with cirrhosis. Medications typically includes octreotide or if not available vasopressin and nitroglycerin to reduce portal pressures. This is typically in addition to endoscopic banding or sclerotherapy for the varices. If this is sufficient then beta blockers and nitrates may be used for the prevention of re-bleeding. If bleeding continues then balloon tamponade with a Sengstaken-Blakemore tube or Minnesota tube may be used in an attempt to mechanically compress the varices. This may then be followed by a transjugular intrahepatic portosystemic shunt.

=== Blood products ===
If large amounts of pack red blood cells are used additional platelets and fresh frozen plasma should be administered to prevent coagulopathies. Some evidence supports holding off on blood transfusions in those who have a hemoglobin greater than 7 to 8 g/dL and only moderate bleeding. If the INR is greater than 1.5 to 1.8 correction with fresh frozen plasma, prothrombin complex may decrease mortality.

=== Procedures ===
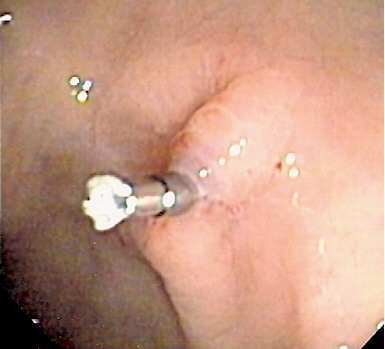
The above ulcer seen after endoscopic clipping

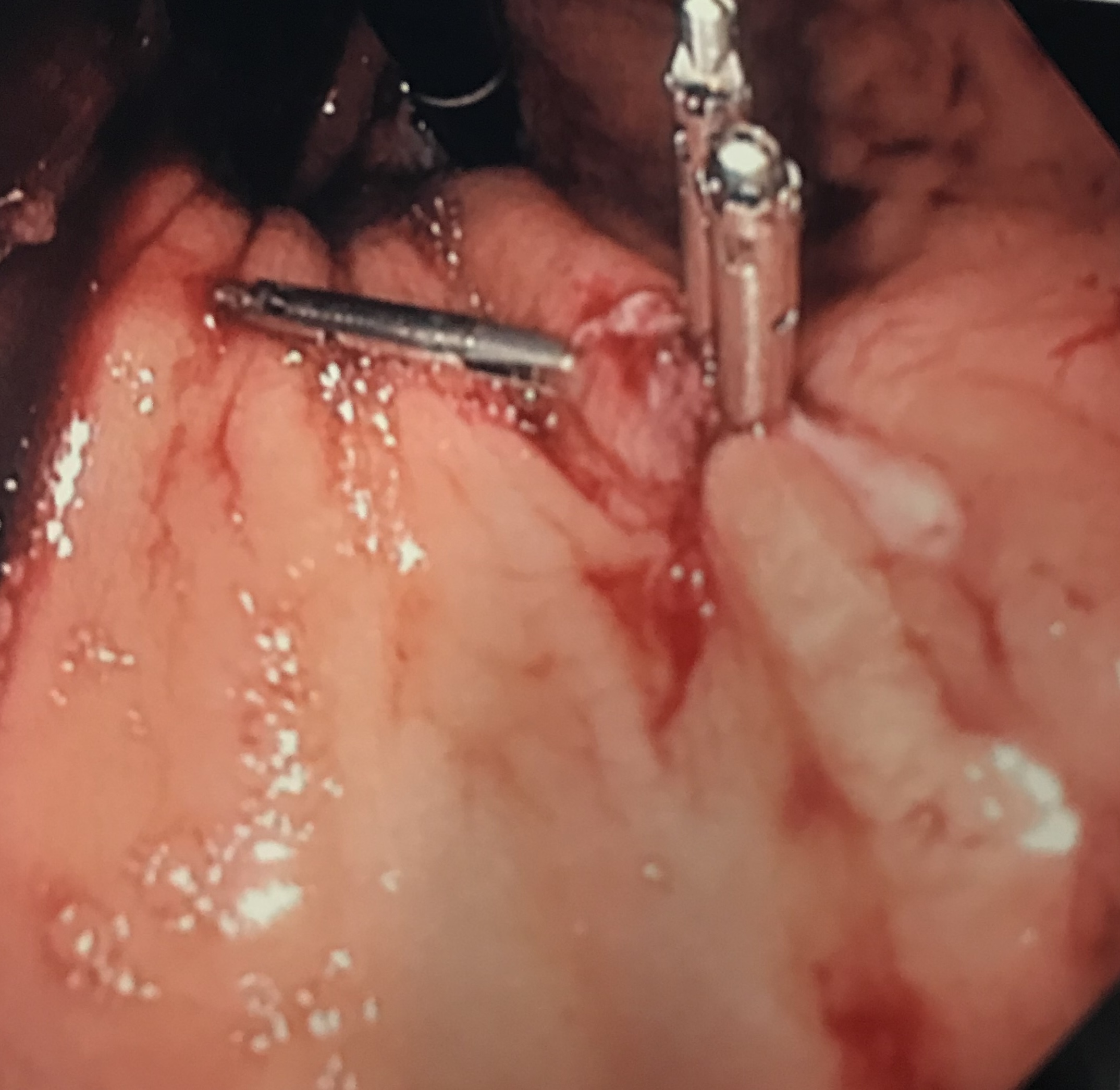
Hemoclipping of the above Dieulafoy’s lesion

Upper endoscopy within 24 hours is the recommended treatment. The benefits versus risks of placing a nasogastric tube in those with upper gastrointestinal bleeding are not well known. Prokinetic agents to empty the stomach such as erythromycin before endoscopy can decrease the amount of blood in the stomach and thus improve the operators view. This erythromycin treatment may lead to a small decrease in the need for a blood transfusion, but the overall balance of how effective erythromycin is compared to potential risks is not clear. Proton pump inhibitors, if they have not been started earlier, are recommended in those in whom high risk signs for bleeding are found. It is also recommended that people with high risk signs are kept in hospital for at least 72 hours. Blood transfusions are not generally recommended to correct anemia, but blood transfusions are recommended if the person is not stable (cardiovascular system instability). Oral iron can be used, but this can lead to problems with compliance, tolerance, darkening stools which may mask evidence of rebleeding and tends to be slow, especially if used in conjunction with proton pump inhibitors. Parenteral Iron is increasingly used in these cases to improve patient outcomes and void blood usage.

== Prognosis ==
Depending on its severity, upper gastrointestinal bleeding may carry an estimated mortality risk of 11%. However, survival has improved to about 2 percent, likely as a result of improvements in medical therapy and endoscopic control of bleeding.

== Epidemiology ==
About 75% of people presenting to the emergency department with gastrointestinal bleeding have an upper source. The diagnosis is easier when the people have hematemesis. In the absence of hematemesis, 40% to 50% of people in the emergency department with gastrointestinal bleeding have an upper source.

== See also ==
- Lower gastrointestinal bleeding
- Forrest classification
- Rockall score
