= Glasgow-Blatchford score =

Medical screening tool to assess internal bleeding

- Purpose: need for blood transfusion due to GI bleeding

The Glasgow-Blatchford bleeding score (GBS) is a screening tool to assess the likelihood that a person with an acute upper gastrointestinal bleeding (UGIB) will need to have medical intervention such as a blood transfusion or endoscopic intervention. The tool may be able to identify people who do not need to be admitted to hospital after a UGIB. Advantages of the GBS over the Rockall score, which assesses the risk of death in UGIB, include a lack of subjective variables such as the severity of systemic diseases and the lack of a need for oesophagogastroduodenoscopy (OGD) to complete the score, a feature unique to the GBS.

It was developed in 2000 by Oliver Blatchford (born 24 August 1954) at the Glasgow Royal Infirmary.

In a controlled study, 16% of people presenting with UGIB had a GBS score of "0", considered low. Among this group there were no deaths or interventions needed and people were able to be effectively treated in an outpatient setting.

== Criteria ==
The score is calculated using the table below:

| Admission risk marker | Score component value |
Blood urea (mmol/L)
| 6.5–8.0 | 2 |
| 8.0–10.0 | 3 |
| 10.0–25 | 4 |
| > 25 | 6 |
Haemoglobin (g/dL) for men
| 12.0–12.9 | 1 |
| 10.0–11.9 | 3 |
| < 10.0 | 6 |
Haemoglobin (g/dL) for women
| 10.0–11.9 | 1 |
| < 10.0 | 6 |
Systolic blood pressure (mm Hg)
| 100–109 | 1 |
| 90–99 | 2 |
| < 90 | 3 |
Other markers
| Pulse ≥ 100/min | 1 |
| Melaena | 1 |
| Syncope | 2 |
| Hepatic disease | 2 |
| Cardiac failure | 2 |

In the validation group, scores of 6 or more were associated with a greater than 50% risk of needing an intervention.

=== Score ===
Score is equal to "0" if the following are all present:

- Hemoglobin level > 12.9 g/dL (men) or > 11.9 g/dL (women)
- Systolic blood pressure > 109 mm Hg
- Pulse < 100/minute
- Blood urea nitrogen level < 6.5 mmol/L
- No melena or syncope
- No past or present liver disease or heart failure

== See also ==
- Rockall score
