= Pancreatic pseudocyst =

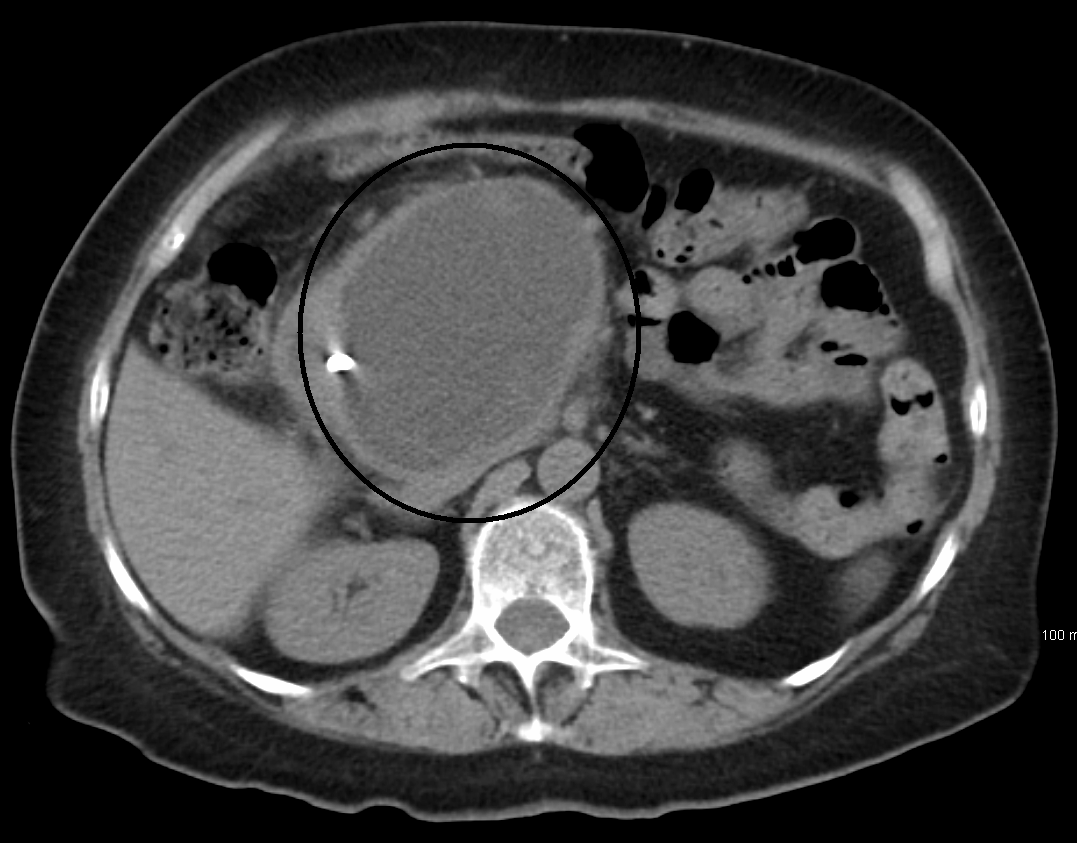
- A pancreatic pseudocyst as seen on CT
- Specialty: Gastroenterology
- Symptoms: Abdominal pain, bloating, nausea, vomiting and lack of appetite
- Complications: Infection, hemorrhage, obstruction
- Causes: Pancreatitis (chronic), Pancreatic neoplasm
- Diagnostic method: Cyst fluid analysis
- Differential diagnosis: Intraductal papillary mucinous neoplasm
- Treatment: Cystogastrostomy

A pancreatic pseudocyst is a circumscribed collection of fluid rich in pancreatic enzymes, blood, and non-necrotic tissue, typically located in the lesser sac of the abdomen. Pancreatic pseudocysts are usually complications of pancreatitis, although in children they frequently occur following abdominal trauma. Pancreatic pseudocysts account for approximately 75% of all pancreatic masses.

== Signs and symptoms ==
Signs and symptoms of pancreatic pseudocyst include abdominal pain, bloating, nausea, vomiting, and lack of appetite.

=== Complications ===
Complications of pancreatic pseudocysts include infection, hemorrhage, obstruction of nearby hollow structures, and rupture. For obstruction, it can cause compression in the GI tract (from the stomach to the colon), urinary system, biliary system, and arteriovenous system.

== Causes ==
Pancreatic pseudocyst can occur due to a variety of reasons, among them pancreatitis (chronic), pancreatic neoplasm and/or pancreatic trauma.

== Pathophysiology ==
Pancreatic pseudocysts are sometimes called false cysts because they do not have an epithelial lining. The wall of the pseudocyst is vascular and fibrotic, encapsulated in the area around the pancreas. Pancreatitis or abdominal trauma can cause its formation. Treatment usually depends on the mechanism that brought about the pseudocyst. Pseudocysts take up to 6 weeks to completely form.

== Diagnosis ==
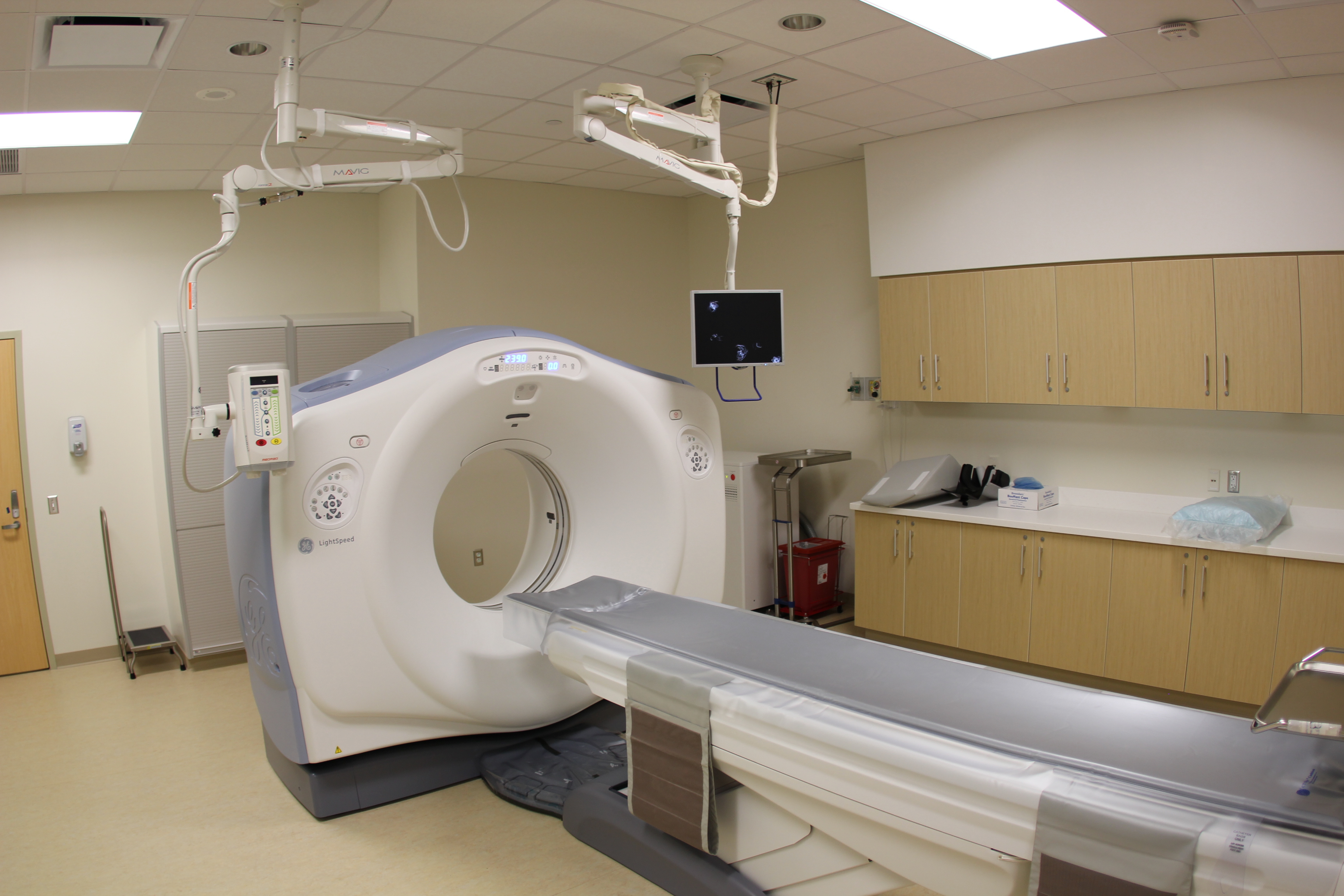
CT scan

Diagnosis of pancreatic pseudocyst can be based on cyst fluid analysis:

- Carcinoembryonic antigen (CEA) and CA-125 (low in pseudocysts and elevated in tumors);
- Fluid viscosity (low in pseudocysts and elevated in tumors);
- Amylase (usually high in pseudocysts and low in tumors)

The most useful imaging tools are:

- Ultrasonography – the role of ultrasonography in imaging the pancreas is limited by patient habitus, operator experience, and the fact that the pancreas lies behind the stomach (and so a gas-filled stomach will obscure the pancreas).
- Computerized tomography – this is the gold standard for initial assessment and follow-up.
- Magnetic resonance cholangiopancreatography (MRCP) – to establish the relationship of the pseudocyst to the pancreatic ducts, though not routinely used

== Treatment ==
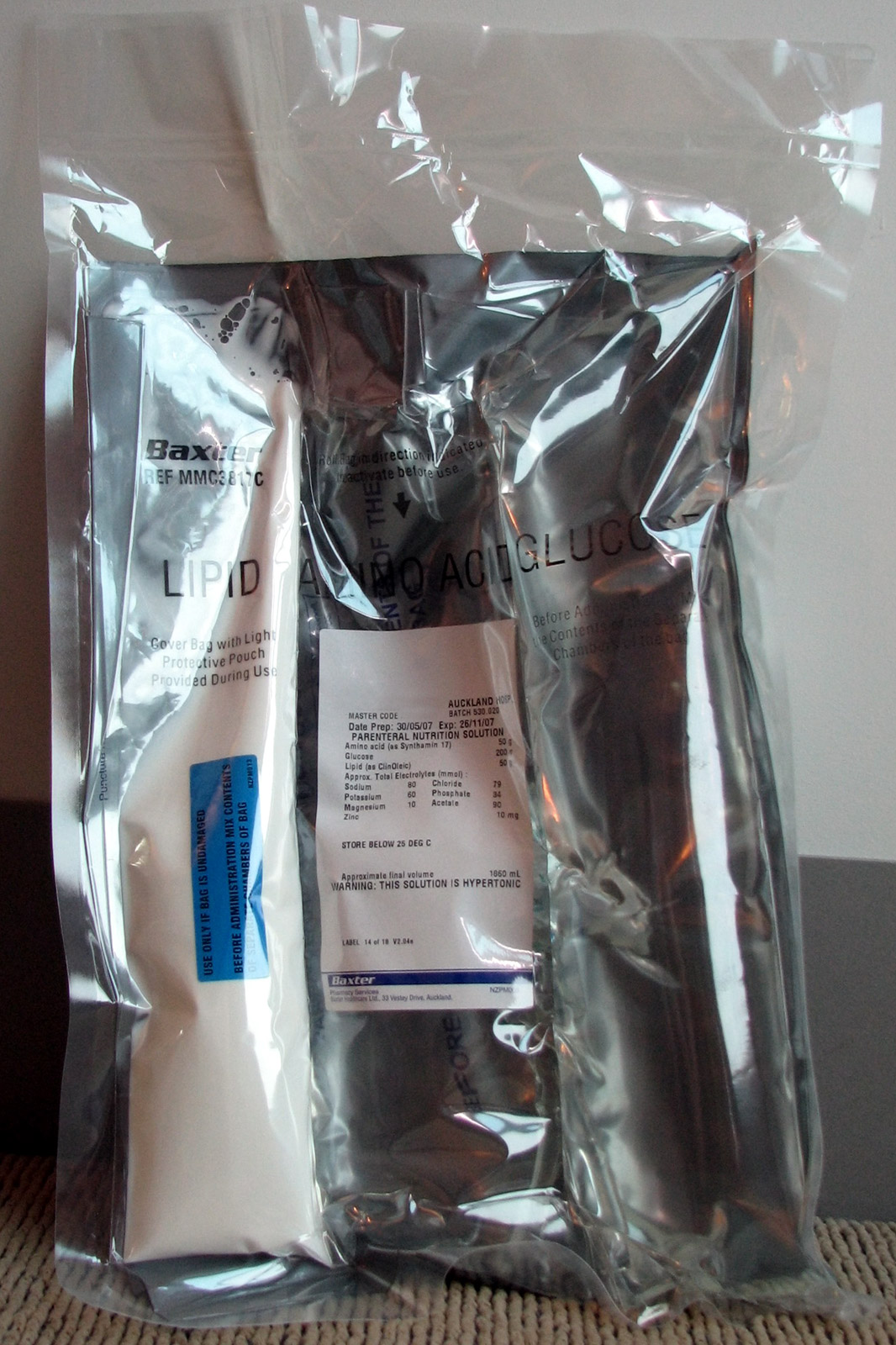
TPN formula

Pancreatic pseudocyst treatment should be aimed at avoiding any complications (1 in 10 cases become infected). They also tend to rupture, and have shown that larger cysts have a higher likelihood of becoming more symptomatic, even needing surgery. If no signs of infection are present, initial treatment may include conservative measures such as bowel rest (NPO), parenteral nutrition (TPN), and observation. If symptoms do not improve, then endoscopic drainage may be necessary. The majority of pseudocysts can be treated endoscopically; surgical intervention is rarely necessary.

In the event of surgery:

- Cystogastrostomy: In this surgical procedure, a connection is created between the back wall of the stomach and the cyst such that the cyst drains into the stomach.
- Cystojejunostomy: In this procedure a connection is created between the cyst and the small intestine so that the cyst fluid directly into the small intestine.
- Cystoduodenostomy: In this procedure, a connection is created between the duodenum (the first part of the intestine) and the cyst to allow drainage of the cyst content into the duodenum. The type of surgical procedure depends on the location of the cyst. For pseudocysts that occur in the head of the pancreas, a cystoduodenostomy is usually performed.

== See also ==
- Pancreas
