= Management of ulcerative colitis =

- Specialty: Gastroenterology

Management of ulcerative colitis involves first treating the acute symptoms of the disease, then maintaining remission. Ulcerative colitis is a form of colitis, a disease of the intestine, specifically the large intestine or colon, that includes characteristic ulcers, or open sores, in the colon. The main symptom of active disease is usually diarrhea mixed with blood, of gradual onset which often leads to anaemia. Ulcerative colitis is, however, a systemic disease that affects many parts of the body outside the intestine.

== Medications ==
Standard treatment for ulcerative colitis depends on extent of involvement and disease severity. The goal is to induce remission initially with medications, followed by the administration of maintenance medications to prevent a relapse of the disease. The concept of induction of remission and maintenance of remission is very important. The medications used to induce and maintain a remission somewhat overlap, but the treatments are different. Physicians first direct treatment to inducing a remission which involves relief of symptoms and mucosal healing of the lining of the colon and then longer-term treatment to maintain the remission.

Anaemia, caused by both chronic blood loss from the gastrointestinal tract and reduced absorption due to the up-regulation of hepcidin should also be treated, and this often requires the use of parenteral iron.

The following sections are sorted first by drug type and, second, by the type of ulcerative colitis:

=== Aminosalicylates ===
Aminosalicylates are the main anti-inflammatory drugs used to treat ulcerative colitis. Sometimes remission can be achieved, or at least maintained, with these drugs alone. If not, they are usually used in combination with the drugs listed in the ensuing sections.

The anti-inflammatory action in all these drugs is produced by 5-aminosalicylic acid (5-ASA), the active ingredient in Mesalazine. 5-ASA is produced from the other drugs in the intestine. The aminosalicylates used to treat ulcerative colitis include the following:

- Mesalazine, also known as 5-aminosalicylic acid, mesalamine, or 5-ASA. Brand names include: Asacol, Octasa, Pentasa, Salofalk, Lialda, Ipocol, Apriso, and Mezavant.
- Sulfasalazine, also known as Azulfidine. This drug is in a traditional class of antibiotics, but decomposes in the intestine, releasing 5-ASA.
- Balsalazide, also known as Colazal, intended to release 5-ASA only in the large intestine.
- Olsalazine, also known as Dipentum, intended to release 5-ASA only in the large intestine.

5-ASA is poorly-absorbed by the intestines, and hence provides topical relief within the intestine. It is therefore a non-systemic drug. 5-ASA is related to the systemic non-steroidal anti-inflammatory drugs (NSAIDs), such as Aspirin and Ibuprofen.

The free radical induction theory, discussed below, proposes that 5-ASA is serving not just as an anti-inflammatory agent, but also as a free radical trap, destroying the hydroxyl and other radicals that may damage colonic epithelial barrier. 5-ASA may also be an inhibitor of TNF.

==== Sulfasalazine side-effects ====
Possible side effects of 5-ASA include, nausea and vomiting, reduced sperm count and damage to red or white blood cells, or to the liver, kidneys, pancreas, nerves or hearing. Allergic reactions to sulfasalazine characterized by dizziness, fever and skin rash have been reported in a small percentage of patients. In some cases, sulfasalazine can exacerbate ulcerative colitis resulting in diarrhea, abdominal cramps and discomfort.

In the intestine sulfasalazine is converted to 5-ASA and sulfapyridine, which is responsible for some of its side-effects, and which should be monitored in patients taking sulfasalazine. Sulfapyridine levels above 50 μg/L are associated with the side-effects.

Patients on high dose sulfasalazine require folic supplementation (1 mg/day) (1000 μg/day) to maintain normal cell division. This may, however, be counter-productive for patients who are also taking methotrexate, which is a folic acid inhibitor. Folic acid might also be counter-productive for patients taking 6-MP and related drugs that inhibit all cell division.

=== Corticosteroids ===
It is often necessary to use corticosteroids in conjunction with 5-ASA drugs to bring about remission of ulcerative colitis. Thereafter it may be possible to maintain remission with 5-ASAs alone, though many patients require other, stronger immunosuppressive medications. Corticosteroids should not be used for long-term therapy of UC, particularly without the concomitant use of an immunomodulator or anti-TNF.

Corticosteroids reduce inflammation by blocking portions of the leukocyte adhesion cascade which results in inflammation.

Side effects of corticosteroids include Cushing's syndrome, which most often exhibits itself as temporary facial puffiness, called "moon face". Cushing's syndrome can, however, involve psychosis, including manic behavior. These drugs have been known to trigger bipolar disorder. In prescribing these drugs it might be well to inquire as to any family history of bipolar disorder.

Corticosteroids should not be confused with anabolic steroids, the controversial performance-building "steroids" that are banned in certain sports.

The following corticosteroids are used as immune system suppressants in treatment of ulcerative colitis:

- Cortisone
- Prednisone
- Hydrocortisone
- Methylprednisolone
- Budesonide, also known as Entocort, available for oral use or as an enema. Budesonide is metabolized faster than traditional steroids and appears to produce fewer systemic side effects.

=== Immunosuppressive drugs ===
Immunosuppressive drugs inhibit the immune system generally. These include the cytostatic drugs that inhibit cell division, including the cloning of white blood cells that is a part of the immune response. Immunosuppressive drugs used with ulcerative colitis include:

- Mercaptopurine, also known as 6-Mercaptopurine, 6-MP and Purinethiol.
- Azathioprine, also known as Imuran (US) or Azasan, which metabolises to 6-MP.
- Methotrexate, which inhibits folic acid.

Mercaptopurine is a cytostatic drug that is an antimetabolite. The mercaptopurine molecule mimics purine, which is necessary for the synthesis of DNA. With mercaptopurine present, cells are not able to make DNA, and cell division is inhibited.

In administering mercaptopurine it is necessary to monitor the levels of mercaptopurine metabolites in the blood to establish the correct dosage for a patient. An initial concern is hepatotoxicity.

Mercaptopurine inhibits the production of white blood cells generally. Because this makes the body more susceptible to infection, patients need to watch for infections. Vaccinations are critically important, particularly the yearly flu shot and periodic pneumonia immunizations. Vaccine response is best if given prior to initiation of immunosuppressive medications, and patients on immunosuppressives should use caution when receiving vaccines containing live virus.

Frequent blood cell counts are also recommended during administration of mercaptopurine. The drug may be toxic to bone marrow, where many blood components are made. If there is an abnormally large drop in white blood cell count, or any blood cell count, administration of the drug should be halted at least temporarily.

Methotrexate is another immunosuppressive drug. It works by inhibiting folic acid, which is necessary for DNA replication and, therefore, cell division.

=== TNF inhibitors ===
TNF is a protein that is released by activated white blood cells, triggering more inflammation, an immune system response and more damage to the mucosa of the colon because of the immune activation. Certain drugs inhibit TNF, hence reducing inflammation and immune system involvement. Infliximab was approved by the FDA for treating ulcerative colitis in March 2005. It is usually given as an intravenous infusions at weeks 0,2 and 6 and then every eight weeks thereafter. It is very useful for inducing and maintaining a remission of ulcerative colitis. Infliximab works better when used in combination with immunmodulators such as 6-mercaptopurine or azathioprine, but a corresponding increase in adverse events means that the decision to use one drug or two must be based on an individualized discussion between the patient and their doctor.

- Infliximab and its biosimilar agents
- Humira and its biosimilar agents

== Treatment of complications ==
=== Proctitis ===
Proctitis is an inflammation of the anus and the lining of the rectum, usually involving the distal, or lower, 10–15 cm (3.9–5.9 in) of the colon, including the rectum. Approximately 30% of ulcerative colitis patients initially present with proctitis.

Standard treatment for active disease includes Mesalazine suppositories and cortisone foam (Cortifoam). Mesalazine 1 g SUPP QHS or Cortifoam QHS/BID is continued until remission, with response seen usually within three weeks.

Maintenance therapy is with Mesalazine 1g QHS or Q3HS. Those with anal irritation or discomfort from the suppositories may switch to oral medications, such as sulfasalazine, Mesalazine, or Colazol, although they are not as effective as suppositories for proctitis. Maintenance therapy is not recommended for those with a first episode that responded to the Mesalazine. Steroid foam is not shown to prevent relapse.

Systemic steroids such as prednisone are not used unless proctitis fails to respond to the above treatments.

=== Proctosigmoiditis and left-sided colitis ===
Proctosigmoiditis and left-sided colitis involves the lower colon, from the rectum up the left side of the patient.

Patients often respond to topical agents alone, such as Mesalazine, or hydrocortisone enemas. Again, the Mesalazine is preferred for maintenance therapy.

- Initially a 4 g Mesalazine enema (Rowasa) is given nightly.
- If response is seen, the enemas can be tapered to every third night.
- If no response, a morning Mesalazine, or hydrocortisone enema (Cortenema) can be given.
- If still no response, oral anti-inflammatory drugs, with or without enemas, can be given, such as sulfasalazine, Mesalazine (Asacol, Pentasa), olsalazine (Dipentum), or balsalazide (Colazal).
- If still no response, dose should be increased to maximum: sulfasalazine maxes at 4-6 g/day, Mesalazine maxes at 4.8 g/day, and olsalazine at 3 g/day. They are usually divided tid or bid.

Oral anti-inflammatory drugs require four to six weeks to work.

Once remission is induced, maintenance levels can be used: sulfasalazine 2 g/day, mesalamine 1.2-2.4 g/day, or olsalazine 1 g/day. Patients on high dose sulfasalazine require folic supplementation (1 mg/day) because it inhibits folate absorption.

If oral Mesalazine is still not working, prednisone is often given, starting at 40–60 mg/day. Prednisone often takes effect within 10–14 days. The dose should then be tapered by about 5 mg/week until it can be stopped altogether.

=== Extensive or pancolitis ===
Extensive or pancolitis. Patients usually require a combination of oral Mesalazine or sulfasalazine along with topical Mesalazine or steroid enemas. Oral prednisone (40–60 mg/day) should be given only in severe cases or if oral Mesalazine fails. Once remission is induced, maintenance therapy is with standard oral Mesalazine doses. Supplemental iron (ferrous sulfate or ferrous gluconate) may be given due to chronic blood loss. Loperamide may be given for symptomatic relief of chronic diarrhea, but should not be given in suspected toxic megacolon.

=== Severe or fulminant colitis ===
Severe or fulminant colitis. Patients need to be hospitalized immediately with subsequent bowel rest, nutrition, and IV steroids. Typical starting choices are hydrocortisone 100 mg IV q8h, prednisolone 30 mg IV q12h, or methylprednisolone 16–20 mg IV q8h. The last two are preferred due to less sodium retention and potassium wasting. 24-hour continuous infusion is preferred than the stated dosing. If the patient has not had any corticosteroids within the last 30 days, IV ACTH 120 units/day as continuous infusion is superior than the IV steroids mentioned above. In either case, if symptoms persist after 2–3 days, Mesalazine or hydrocortisone enemas daily or bid can be given. The use of antibiotics in those with severe colitis is not clear. However, there are those patients who have sub-optimal response to corticosteroids and continue to run a low grade fever with bandemia. Typically they can be treated with IV ciprofloxacin and metronidazole. However, in those with fulminant colitis or megacolon, with high fever, leukocytosis with high bandemia, and peritoneal signs, broad spectrum antibiotics should be given (i.e., ceftazidime, cefepime, imipeneum, meropenem, etc.). Abdominal x-ray should also be ordered. If intestinal dilation is seen, patients should be decompressed with NG tube and or rectal tube.

=== Refractory ulcerative colitis ===
Refractory ulcerative colitis. Patients with toxic megacolon (colonic dilation > 6 cm and toxic appearing) who do not respond to steroid therapy within 72 hours should be consulted for colectomy. Those with less severe disease but do not respond to IV steroids within 7–10 days should be considered for colectomy or IV cyclosporine. IV cyclosporine at a rate of 2 mg/kg/day and if no response in 7–10 days, colectomy should be considered. If response is seen, oral cyclosporine at 8 mg/kg/day should be continued for 3–4 months while 6-MP or azathioprine is introduced. Those already on 6-MP or azathioprine should continue with these medications. A cholesterol level should be checked in patients taking cyclosporine as low cholesterol may predispose to seizures. Also, prophylaxis against PCP (Pneumocystis carinii) pneumonia is advised.

== Surgery ==
Unlike Crohn's disease, which cannot be cured/eliminated by surgically removing the diseased portions of the intestine and reconnecting the healthy ends, ulcerative colitis can generally be cured by surgical removal of the large intestine. Surgical removal of the large intestine will not get rid of extra-intestinal symptoms. This procedure is necessary in the event of exsanguinating hemorrhage, frank perforation, or documented or strongly suspected carcinoma. Surgery is also indicated for patients with severe colitis or toxic megacolon. Patients with symptoms that are disabling and do not respond to drugs may wish to consider whether surgery would improve the quality of life. Depending on the type of surgery performed, the patient may still require periodic lower endoscopies to assess the pouch for dysplasia.

Ulcerative colitis is a disease that affects many parts of the body outside the intestinal tract. In rare cases the extra-intestinal manifestations of the disease may require removal of the colon.

== Microbiome modification ==
A Cochrane review of controlled trials using various probiotics found low-certainty evidence that probiotic supplements may increase the probability of clinical remission. People receiving probiotics were 73% more likely to experience disease remission and over 2x as likely to report improvement in symptoms compared to those receiving a placebo, with no clear difference in minor or serious adverse effects.Although there was no clear evidence of greater remission when probiotic supplements were compared with 5‐aminosalicylic acid treatment as a monotherapy, the likelihood of remission was 22% higher if probiotics were used in combination with 5-aminosalicylic acid therapy.

It is currently unclear whether probiotics help to prevent future relapse in people with stable disease activity, either as a monotherapy or combination therapy.

== Alternative treatments ==
=== Dietary modification ===
There is no good evidence that dietary interventions have any impact on ulcerative colitis.

=== Fats and oils ===
- Fish oil, eicosapentaenoic acid (EPA) is not conclusive.
- Slow release phosphatidylcholine has some evidence of benefit in ulcerative colitis.

=== Antioxidants ===
The free radical induction theory suggests that the initial cause of ulcerative colitis may be a metabolic defect that allows a buildup of chemicals related to hydrogen peroxide beneath the membrane that protects the cells of the intestinal wall from the bacteria inside the intestine, resulting in destruction of the membrane. During remission the membrane is reestablished, but may be subject to new damage, resulting in a flare up of the disease. To the extent this may be true, it would be appropriate to take antioxidants, dietary supplements that may support the body's defenses against oxidants like hydrogen peroxide. Antioxidants include:

- Vitamins A, C and E
- Coenzyme Q10
- Selenium and manganese.

Vitamin B6 and iron may be associated with increased hydrogen peroxide levels, and should not be taken in excess under this theory.

- S-Methylmethionine has been shown in animal models to reverse ulcers.

=== Helminthic therapy ===
Inflammatory bowel disease is less common in the developing world and it has been suggested that this may be because intestinal parasites are more common in underdeveloped countries. Some parasites are able to reduce the immune response of the intestine, an adaptation that helps the parasite colonize the intestine. A decrease in immune response could be helpful in inflammatory bowel disease.

Helminthic therapy using the whipworm Trichuris suis was shown in a randomized control trial to produce benefit in patients with ulcerative colitis. This therapy tests the hygiene hypothesis which argues that the absence of helminths in the colons of patients in the western world may lead to inflammation. Both helminthic therapy and fecal bacteriotherapy induce a characteristic Th2 white cell response in the diseased areas, which is somewhat paradoxical given that ulcerative colitis immunology was thought to classically involve Th2 overproduction.
