= Black drop =

Black drop or blackdrop may refer to:

- Black drop effect, an optical phenomenon visible during a transit of Venus
- Laudanum
  - Kendal Black Drop, names sometimes used for a 19th century medicine made with opium
- Pitch drop experiment, demonstration of the time that it takes for a drop of pitch to fall
