= Aminosalicylate =

Class of medications for treating inflammatory bowel diseases

An aminosalicylate is a class of medications that is often used to treat ulcerative colitis and Crohn's disease. The class includes among others:

- 4-Aminosalicylic acid
- Balsalazide
- Olsalazine
- Sulfasalazine
- Mesalazine (5-Aminosalicylic acid)

Side effects may include abdominal pain, diarrhea, headaches, and nausea.
