= C7H7NO3 =

The molecular formula C_{7}H_{7}NO_{3} may refer to:

- Aminosalicylic acids
  - 4-Aminosalicylic acid
  - Mesalazine
- 3-Hydroxyanthranilic acid
- o-Nitroanisole
- 3-Nitrobenzyl alcohol
- Salicylhydroxamic acid
