= Diverticular disease =

Problems arising from pouch formations in the large intestinal wall

- Endoscopic image of diverticulosis (showing two diverticula)
- Specialty: Gastroenterology
- Symptoms: Abdominal pain, bowel habit changes, nausea, vomiting
- Causes: Diverticulosis
- Diagnostic method: Abdominal imaging, white blood cell count, inflammatory markers, fecal calprotectin, colonoscopy and biopsy
- Differential diagnosis: Crohn's disease, ulcerative colitis, irritable bowel syndrome, colorectal cancer
- Treatment: Antibiotics, antispasmodics, corticosteroids

Diverticular disease is when problems occur due to diverticulosis, a benign condition defined by the formation of pouches (diverticula) from weak spots in the wall of the large intestine. This disease spectrum includes diverticulitis, symptomatic uncomplicated diverticular disease (SUDD), and segmental colitis associated with diverticulosis (SCAD). The most common symptoms across the disease spectrum are abdominal pain and bowel habit changes such as diarrhea or constipation. Otherwise, diverticulitis presents with systemic symptoms such as fever and elevated white blood cell count whereas SUDD and SCAD do not. Treatment ranges from conservative bowel rest to medications such as antibiotics, antispasmodics, acetaminophen, and corticosteroids depending on the specific conditions.

== Signs and symptoms ==
The signs and symptoms of diverticular disease stem from inflammation and irritation of the colonic tissues, which can manifest as:

- Abdominal pain that may be persistent for days. Pain is typically located in the left lower quadrant. However, in people of Asian descent, pain is reported more on the right side.
- Diarrhea
- Constipation
- Nausea and vomiting
- Fever
- Rectal bleeding

== Causes ==
=== Diverticulitis ===
Acute diverticulitis is thought to arise from either trauma or lack of blood flow to the existing diverticulum in the colon.

- The traumatic theory proposes that a fecalith, which is a hardened fecal matter, becomes trapped in a diverticulum, leading to colonic mucosa abrasion and local inflammation. Subsequent bacterial overgrowth and infection spreads from the mucosal wall to full bowel wall, eventually leading to bowel perforation.
- In the ischemic theory, it is thought that long standing colonic contraction causes blood vessel compression at the diverticular neck, leading to ischemia, inflammatory response, and perforation. These long standing contractions are attributed to lower choline acetyltransferase activity in the colonic circular muscle layer.

Complicated acute diverticulitis is distinguished from uncomplicated diverticulitis by the presence of abscess or colonic perforation.

Chronic smoldering diverticulitis is caused by recurrent acute diverticulitis that does not respond to medical treatment but does not progress to complications such as abscess, peritonitis, enteric fistula, or bowel obstruction.

=== Symptomatic uncomplicated diverticular disease ===
Similar to the diverticulitis ischemia theory above, SUDD is thought to be caused by sustained colonic contraction leading to mucosal ischemia within the diverticulum. However, SUDD occurs when only abdominal pain with bowel habit change is present, without any other systemic symptoms of diverticulitis like fever, elevated white blood cell count, elevated C-reactive protein.

Low grade inflammation of the colonic mucosa within the diverticulum and visceral hypersensitivity are also thought to cause SUDD.

=== Segmental colitis associated with diverticulosis ===
SCAD, also known as diverticular colitis, is when there is mucosal inflammation in a colonic segment with diverticulosis that may or may not have evidence of diverticulitis, or inflammation within or around a diverticulum itself. The involved colonic segment is mostly confined to the sigmoid. The cause is currently unknown. It is thought to be multi-factorial, including colonic ischemia, cardiovascular risk factors, mucosal prolapse, or fecal stasis and subsequent microbiome disturbance, eventually leading to inflammation of the colon segment.

== Risk factors ==
Many risk factors contribute to the development and severity of diverticular disease, such as

- Advanced age – diverticular disease typically presents in the sixth decade of life.
- Colonic wall structure – points of blood vessel entry in the colonic wall are weaker and more prone to mucosal herniation.
- Fiber intake – although it is widely believed that low fiber diet is associated with diverticulosis and diverticular disease, recent studies have not confirmed the association but has shown that increased fiber intake reduces diverticular disease complications.
- NSAIDs and Aspirin use – these drugs have been shown to increase risk of diverticular bleeding and diverticulitis complications such as diverticular perforation.
- Genetics – over 30 susceptibility loci have been identified for diverticular disease, including ARHGAP15, COLQ, and FAM155A.
- Vitamin D – although the mechanism is unclear, recent studies have shown that vitamin D insufficient patients have higher risk of complicated diverticulitis.

== Diagnosis ==
=== Diverticulitis ===
Diverticulitis typically presents with tenderness in the left lower abdomen, fever, bowel habit changes such as constipation or diarrhea. Laboratory abnormalities include elevated white blood count and inflammatory markers (C-reactive protein and erythrocyte sedimentation rate). Imaging via computed tomography (CT) is the standard for diagnosing diverticulitis and evaluating potential complications.

=== Symptomatic uncomplicated diverticular disease ===
SUDD clinically presents with left lower abdominal pain and bowel habit changes (predominantly diarrhea). The pain is chronic and does not improve with bowel movement, which distinguishes SUDD from irritable bowel syndrome. There is no systemic inflammation in SUDD, evident by lack of fever, normal white blood count and inflammatory markers. Fecal calprotectin is increased and can be used to correlate with the severity of symptoms.

=== Segmental colitis associated with diverticulosis ===
SCAD typically presents with rectal bleeding with or without bowel habit changes. Fever is usually absent. Unlike other diverticular diseases, SCAD symptoms resolve with very limited pharmaceutical intervention, if any. Endoscopic evaluation and biopsy are needed for diagnosis. They should show evidence of inflammation in the mucosa in-between diverticula, with sparing of the rectum and proximal colon. Histopathological features of SCAD include tumor necrosis factor alpha overexpression and absence of granuloma. Laboratory workup would return normal white blood count, negative serological markers and negative anti-Saccharomyces cerevisiae antibodies, distinguishing SCAD from autoimmune and other inflammatory bowel diseases.

== Treatment ==
=== Diverticulitis ===
Uncomplicated diverticulitis is generally treated conservatively with bowel rest and no antibiotics given recent studies have shown that antibiotics are likely not necessary. Complicated diverticulitis is treated with antibiotics and may require surgical interventions such as abscess drainage or fistula repair. Pain is managed with antispasmodics or acetaminophen, rather than NSAIDs (ibuprofen, aspirin, etc.).

Antibiotics should be used selectively in most cases of uncomplicated diverticulitis. However, antibiotic use is strongly advised in immunocompromised patients.

Colonoscopy is recommended 6–8 weeks after an episode of complicated diverticulitis or a first-ever episode of diverticulitis. The purpose of the procedure is to confirm diagnosis of diverticular disease and rule out other conditions like cancer. Elective segmental colectomy can be considered in selective group of patients to reduce risk of recurrent diverticulitis. However, the procedure does not completely eliminate the risk of recurrence.

=== Symptomatic uncomplicated diverticular disease ===
There is insufficient evidence for recommending probiotics.

=== Segmental colitis associated with diverticulosis ===
SCAD is a benign and self-limited condition that resolves on its own. In ongoing or recurrent cases, medical treatments with antibiotics, mesalazine, and corticosteroids might be required.
