= Jason F. Hall =

American physician and gastroenterologist (born 1974)

Jason Hall
- Born: 1974 (age 51–52); Worcester, Massachusetts, U.S.
- Education: College of the Holy Cross (BA); Harvard University (MD, MPH)
- Medical career
- Field: Gastroenterology
- Institutions: Boston University; Boston Medical Center; Tufts University; Tufts Medical Center
- Sub-specialties: Colorectal surgery
- Research: Diverticular disease

Jason F. Hall (born 1974) is an American colorectal surgeon and gastroenterologist known for his research on diverticular disease. He is a professor of medicine, a professor of public health and community medicine, and the Benjamin Andrews Chair of Surgery at the Tufts University School of Medicine. He is also the surgeon-in-chief and chair of surgery at the Tufts Medical Center.

== Early life and education ==
Hall was born in Worcester, Massachusetts, in 1974. He was raised in northern Mexico and central Massachusetts. He graduated from the College of the Holy Cross with a Bachelor of Arts, cum laude, in chemistry in 1996. As an undergraduate at Holy Cross, he was named the Fenwick Scholar, the college's highest academic honor. He then earned his Doctor of Medicine (M.D.) from Harvard Medical School in 2001 on a Howard Hughes Medical Institute scholarship, and earned his Master of Public Health (M.P.H.) from the Harvard T.H. Chan School of Public Health in 2010.

== Academic career ==
Hall completed his residency in general surgery at Massachusetts General Hospital and completed a medical fellowship in colorectal surgery at the Lahey Hospital & Medical Center, where he became the center's program director for colorectal surgery residency.

In April 2016, Hall became an associate professor of surgery at the Boston University School of Medicine and was appointed the chief of colon and rectal surgery at the Boston Medical Center, where he was also named the co-director of the Dempsey Center for Digestive Disorders. On July 1, 2022, he became the surgeon-in-chief and chairman of the Department of Surgery at Tufts Medical Center and was simultaneously named a professor of surgery and the Benjamin Andrews Professor and Chair of Surgery at the Tufts University School of Medicine. That same year, he was elected the vice president of the New England Society of Colon and Rectal Surgery.

Hall is known for his research on diverticular disease, colorectal cancer, and fistulas. He is a fellow of the American College of Surgeons and a fellow of the American Society of Colon and Rectal Surgeons.

== Selected publications ==
- Hall, Jason F. (December 2013). "Advanced degrees in academic colorectal surgery". Clinics in Colon and Rectal Surgery. 26 (4): 250–253. doi:10.1055/s-0033-1356726. ISSN 1531-0043. PMC 3842530. PMID 24436686.
- Hall, Jason F. (December 2015). "Management of Malignant Adenomas". Clinics in Colon and Rectal Surgery. 28 (4): 215–219. doi:10.1055/s-0035-1564434. ISSN 1531-0043. PMC 4654623. PMID 26664328.
- Mitchem, Jonathan B.; Hall, Jason F. (December 2016). "Adenomatous Polyposis Syndromes: Diagnosis and Management". Clinics in Colon and Rectal Surgery. 29 (4): 321–329. doi:10.1055/s-0036-1584089. ISSN 1531-0043. PMC 6878829. PMID 31777463.
- Madiedo, Andrea; Hall, Jason F. (March 2021). "Minimally Invasive Management of Diverticular Disease". Clinics in Colon and Rectal Surgery. 34 (2): 113–120. doi:10.1055/s-0040-1716703. ISSN 1531-0043. PMC 7904339. PMID 33642951.
