= Segmental colitis associated with diverticulosis =

- Other names: SCAD
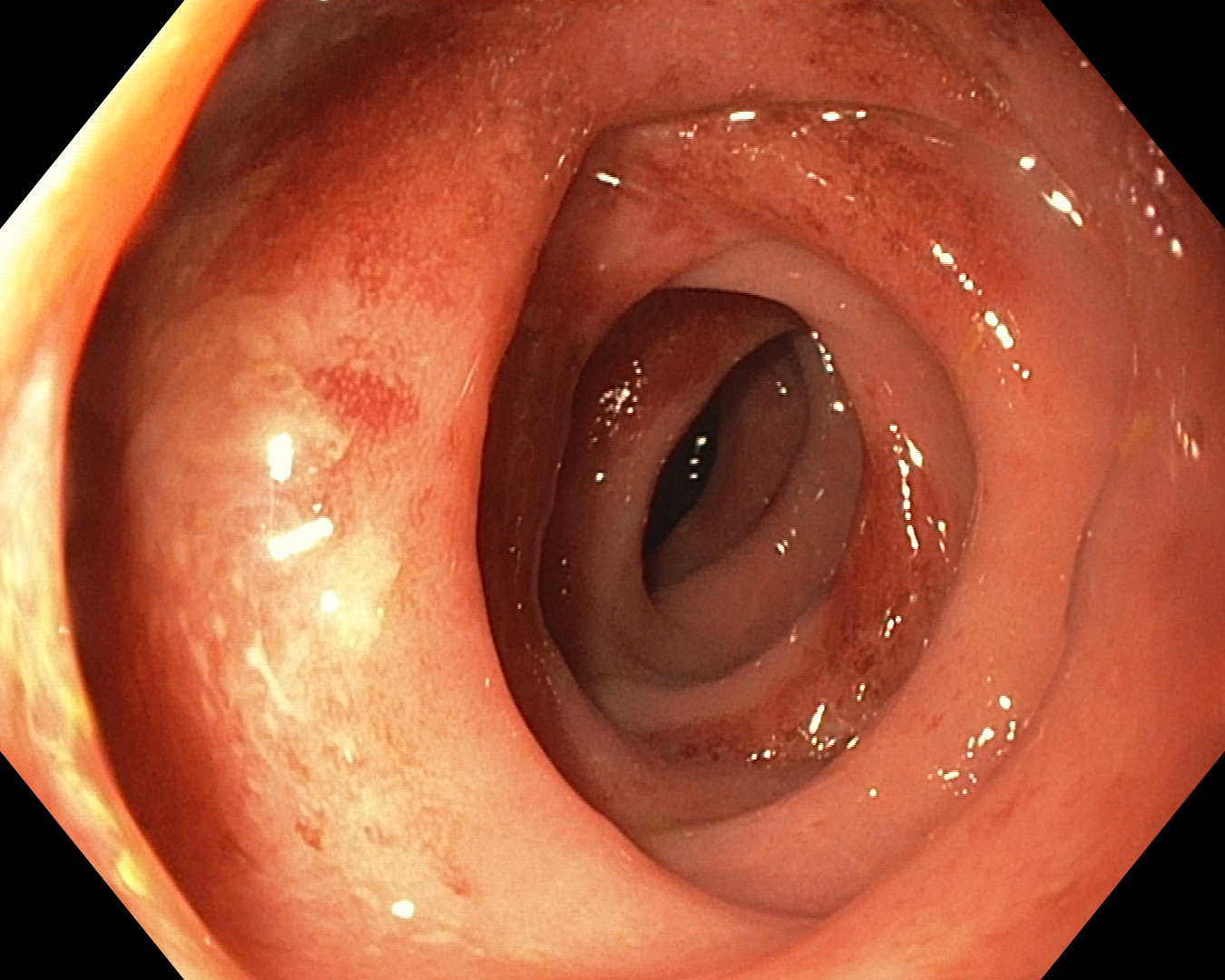
- Endoscopic image of segmental colitis associated with diverticulosis, Type A
- Specialty: Gastroenterology
- Symptoms: Rectal bleeding, Abdominal cramping, Asymptomatic
- Usual onset: 64 years of age
- Types: A-D
- Diagnostic method: Colonoscopy
- Differential diagnosis: Bacterial colitis, Diverticulitis, NSAID-induced colitis, Crohn's disease, Ulcerative colitis
- Treatment: Antibiotics, Mesalamine, Prednisone, Surgery
- Prognosis: Benign
- Frequency: 0.3 - 1.3%

Segmental colitis associated with diverticulosis (SCAD) is a condition characterized by localized inflammation in the colon, which spares the rectum and is associated with multiple sac-like protrusions or pouches in the wall of the colon (diverticulosis). Unlike diverticulitis, SCAD involves inflammation of the colon between diverticula (interdiverticular mucosa), while sparing the diverticular orifices. SCAD may lead to abdominal pain, especially in the left lower quadrant, intermittent rectal bleeding and chronic diarrhea.

The cause of SCAD is unknown, but may be related to local colonic ischemia, fecal stasis, or mucosal prolapse. The factors that cause SCAD likely overlap with inflammatory bowel disease. There are four types of SCAD, which are categorized based on the appearance during colonoscopy. Pattern A is characterized by involvement of crescentic folds and is the most common type of SCAD (52%). Pattern B has an appearance similar to mild-to moderate ulcerative colitis (30.40%), whereas pattern C appears similar to Crohn's disease (10.90%). Pattern D is the least common and appears similar to severe ulcerative colitis (6.50%).

SCAD is diagnosed by colonoscopy. Additional testing may be necessary to rule out infectious causes of colitis. Evaluation should include assessment for additional causes of colitis, such as medication induced (checkpoint inhibitors, NSAIDs, etc.). Laboratory results are usually normal in SCAD, although the white blood cell count may be mildly elevated. Fecal calprotectin, a marker of colon inflammation, may be elevated. Computed tomography of the abdomen is not routinely necessary, but may show thickening or inflammation in the distal colon (sigmoid colon) with associated diverticulosis.

Treatment may consist of antibiotics, aminosalicylates (mesalamine), or prednisone. In rare cases, surgery with segmental resection may be considered. The long term prognosis is likely benign, although data is lacking. The prevalence of SCAD ranges from 0.3 - 1.3 percent.

== Types ==
There are four types of SCAD, based on endoscopic appearance. Pattern A is characterized by involvement of crescentic folds and is the most common type of SCAD (52%). Pattern B has an appearance similar to mild-to moderate ulcerative colitis (30.40%), whereas pattern C appears similar to Crohn's disease (10.90%). Pattern D is the least common, and appears similar to severe ulcerative colitis (6.50%).

== Signs and symptoms ==
People with SCAD may develop left lower quadrant abdominal cramping, intermittent rectal bleeding, and chronic diarrhea. Rectal bleeding (hematochezia) is the most common symptom, and is the presenting complaint in more than 70% of individuals with SCAD. Fever is rare.

== Pathophysiology ==
The cause of segmental colitis associated with diverticula is unknown. Several factors may influence the development of the disease, such as local colonic ischemia, fecal stasis, or mucosal prolapse. SCAD shares some features with inflammatory bowel disease, including the increase of tumor necrosis factor (TNF) alpha during active disease, and decrease in TNF during health improvement. The pathogenesis of SCAD likely overlaps with inflammatory bowel disease.

== Diagnosis ==
SCAD is diagnosed via colonoscopy, often incidentally during examination for unrelated concerns. Colonoscopy shows erythema of the colonic mucosa, which may be characterized by friability and exudate. The descending and sigmoid colon are typically involved. Biopsies of the affected area show evidence of chronic inflammation, whereas the rectum is normal, confirming the diagnosis.

It is important and occasionally difficult to distinguish SCAD from inflammatory bowel disease (IBD). Biopsies reveal histologic findings that are identical in both conditions. However, ulcerative colitis usually affects the rectum and inflammation in IBD extends to areas of the colon without diverticulosis.

Additional causes of colitis should be evaluated, including infectious and medication-induced, particularly NSAID-associated.

Laboratory results are usually normal in individuals with SCAD. The white blood cell count may be mildly elevated. Fecal calprotectin, a marker of colon inflammation, may be elevated in individuals with SCAD. Fecal calprotectin may assist in distinguishing SCAD from irritable bowel syndrome.

Imaging tests, including CT abdomen, may show inflammation or thickening of the distal colon, with associated diverticulosis. There may be evidence of inflammation extending around the bowel (fat stranding).

== Treatment ==
There are several options in treatment for SCAD. Data is lacking, and there are no prospective trials comparing different therapies for SCAD. As of 2017, there are no guidelines available to direct treatment. Treatment may include antibiotics, aminosalicylates, and corticosteroids. Antibiotics include ciprofloxacin and metronidazole, given for 14 days. If symptoms recur after improvement with antibiotics, a second course of antibiotics may be given.

If an initial course of antibiotics is ineffective, then mesalamine may be tried. If mesalamine is ineffective, then a course of prednisone may be helpful. In severe cases of SCAD, where corticosteroids are unable to be discontinued, then surgery may be considered (segmental resection).

== Prognosis ==
The natural history of SCAD lacks rigorous study, with little data regarding long term outcomes. However, the course appears to be largely benign. In cases that require surgery, recurrence of disease is rare. Long term medication therapy is rarely necessary. Over a course of 7 years, about half of people with SCAD experience a recurrence of symptoms. About a third of people have a mild recurrence.

== Epidemiology ==
Among individuals with diverticulosis, the prevalence of SCAD ranges from 0.3 - 1.3%. SCAD is more common in men. SCAD often occurs in elderly individuals, with an average of 64 years upon diagnosis.

== History ==
SCAD was first described in a case series in 1984. SCAD was initially believed to represent a complication of diverticular disease. As evidence suggested increasing overlap with inflammatory bowel disease, SCAD became recognized as a distinct condition.
