= Laudanum =

Tincture of opium

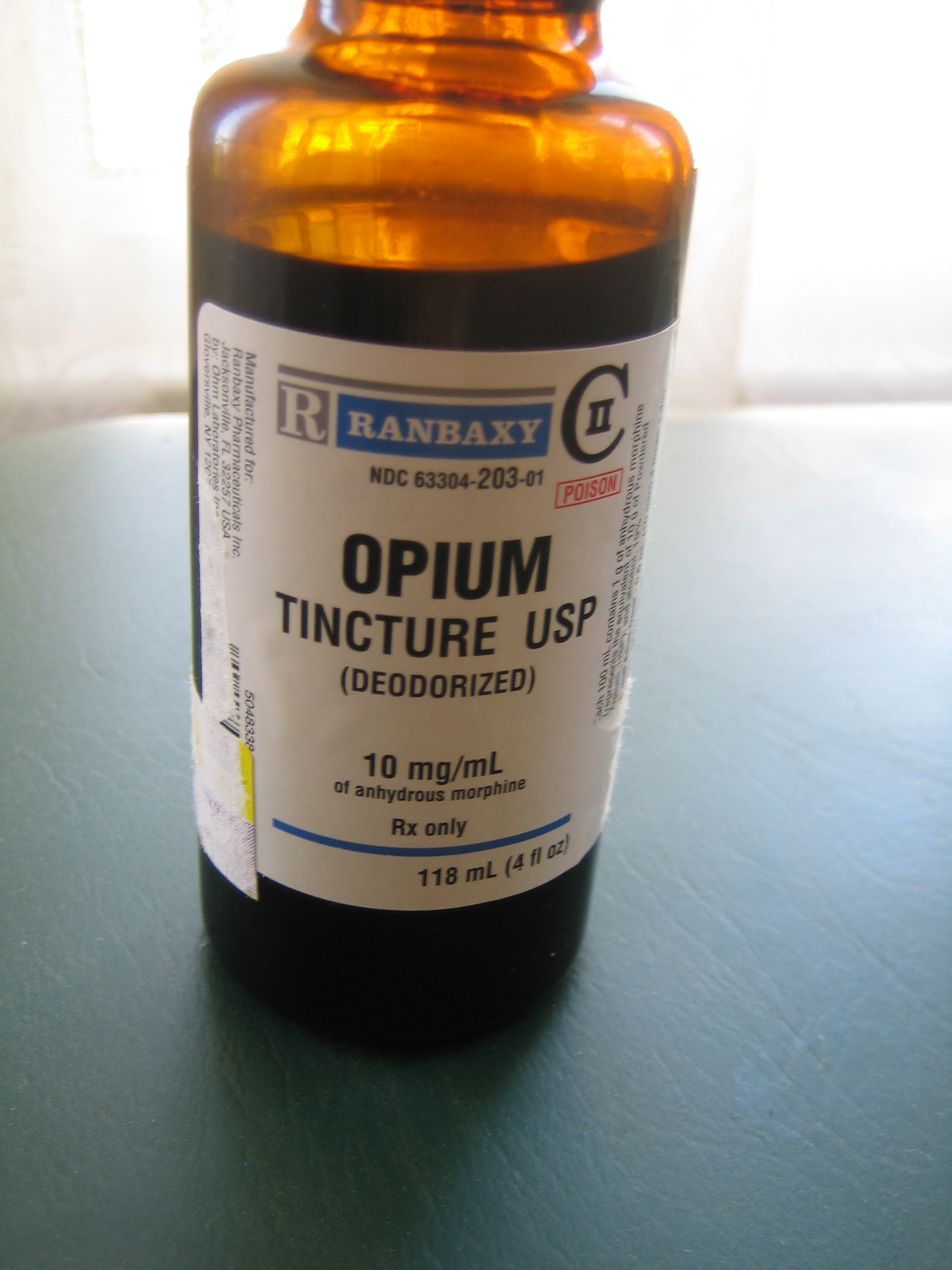

Combination of
- Opium: Analgesic
- Ethanol: Tincture

Clinical data
- Pronunciation: /ˈlɔːdənəm/ LAW-dən-əm
- Trade names: Dropizol
- Routes of administration: Oral, buccal, sublingual
- ATC code: A07DA02 (WHO)

Legal status
- Legal status: UK: Class A; US: Schedule II; UN: Narcotic Schedule I

Laudanum is a tincture of opium containing approximately 10% powdered opium by weight (the equivalent of 1% morphine). Laudanum is prepared by dissolving extracts from the opium poppy (Papaver somniferum) in alcohol (ethanol).

Reddish-brown in color and extremely bitter, laudanum contains several opium alkaloids, including morphine and codeine. Laudanum was historically used to treat a variety of conditions, but its principal use was as a strong pain medication and cough suppressant. Until the early 20th century, laudanum was sold without a prescription and was a constituent of many patent medicines. Laudanum has since been recognized as addictive and is strictly regulated and controlled throughout most of the world. The United States Controlled Substances Act, for example, lists it on Schedule II, the second strictest category and strictest category which can be prescribed.

Laudanum is known as a "whole opium" preparation since it historically contained all the alkaloids found in the opium poppy, which are extracted from the dried latex of ripe seed pods (Papaver somniferum L., succus siccus). However, the modern drug is often processed to remove all or most of the noscapine (also called narcotine) present as this is a strong emetic and does not add appreciably to the analgesic or antipropulsive properties of opium; the resulting solution is called Denarcotized Tincture of Opium or Deodorized Tincture of Opium (DTO).

Laudanum remains available by prescription in the United States (under the generic name "opium tincture") and in the European Union and United Kingdom (under the trade name Dropizol), although the drug's therapeutic indication is generally limited to controlling diarrhea when other medications have failed.

The terms laudanum and tincture of opium are generally interchangeable, but in contemporary medical practice, the latter is used almost exclusively.

== History ==
=== Paracelsus' laudanum ===
Paracelsus, a 16th-century Swiss alchemist, experimented with various opium concoctions, and recommended opium for reducing pain. One of his preparations, a pill which he extolled as his "archanum" or "laudanum", may have contained opium. Paracelsus's laudanum was strikingly different from the standard laudanum of the 17th century and beyond, containing crushed pearls, musk, amber, and other substances.

=== British laudanum ===
One researcher has documented that "Laudanum, as listed in the London Pharmacopoeia (1618), was a pill made from opium, saffron, castor, ambergris, musk and nutmeg".

=== Sydenham's laudanum ===
In the 1660s English physician Thomas Sydenham (1624–1689) popularized a proprietary opium tincture that he also named laudanum, although it differed substantially from the laudanum of Paracelsus. In 1676 Sydenham published a seminal work, Medical Observations Concerning the History and Cure of Acute Diseases, in which he promoted his brand of opium tincture, and advocated its use for a range of medical conditions.

=== 18th century ===
By the 18th century, the medicinal properties of opium and laudanum were well known, and the term "laudanum" came to refer to any combination of opium and alcohol.

In the 18th century several physicians published works about it, including John Jones, who wrote The Mysteries of Opium Revealed (1700), which was described by one commentator as "extraordinary and perfectly unintelligible". The Scottish physician John Brown, creator of the Brunonian system of medicine, recommended opium for what he termed asthenic conditions, but his system was discredited by the time of his death. The most influential work was by George Young, who published a comprehensive medical text entitled Treatise on Opium (1753). Young, an Edinburgh surgeon and physician, wrote this to counter an essay on opium by his contemporary Charles Alston, professor of botany and materia medica at Edinburgh who had recommended the use of opium for a wide variety of conditions. Young countered this by emphasising the risks '...that I may prevent such mischief as I can, I here give it as my sincere opinion... that opium is a poison by which great numbers are daily destroyed.' Young gives a comprehensive account of the indications for the drug including its complications. He is critical about writers whose knowledge of the drug is based on chemical or animal experiments rather than clinical practice. The treatise is a detailed, balanced and valuable guide to prevailing knowledge and practice. As it gained popularity, opium, and after 1820, morphine, was mixed with a wide variety of agents, drugs and chemicals including mercury, hashish, cayenne pepper, ether, chloroform, belladonna, whiskey, wine and brandy."

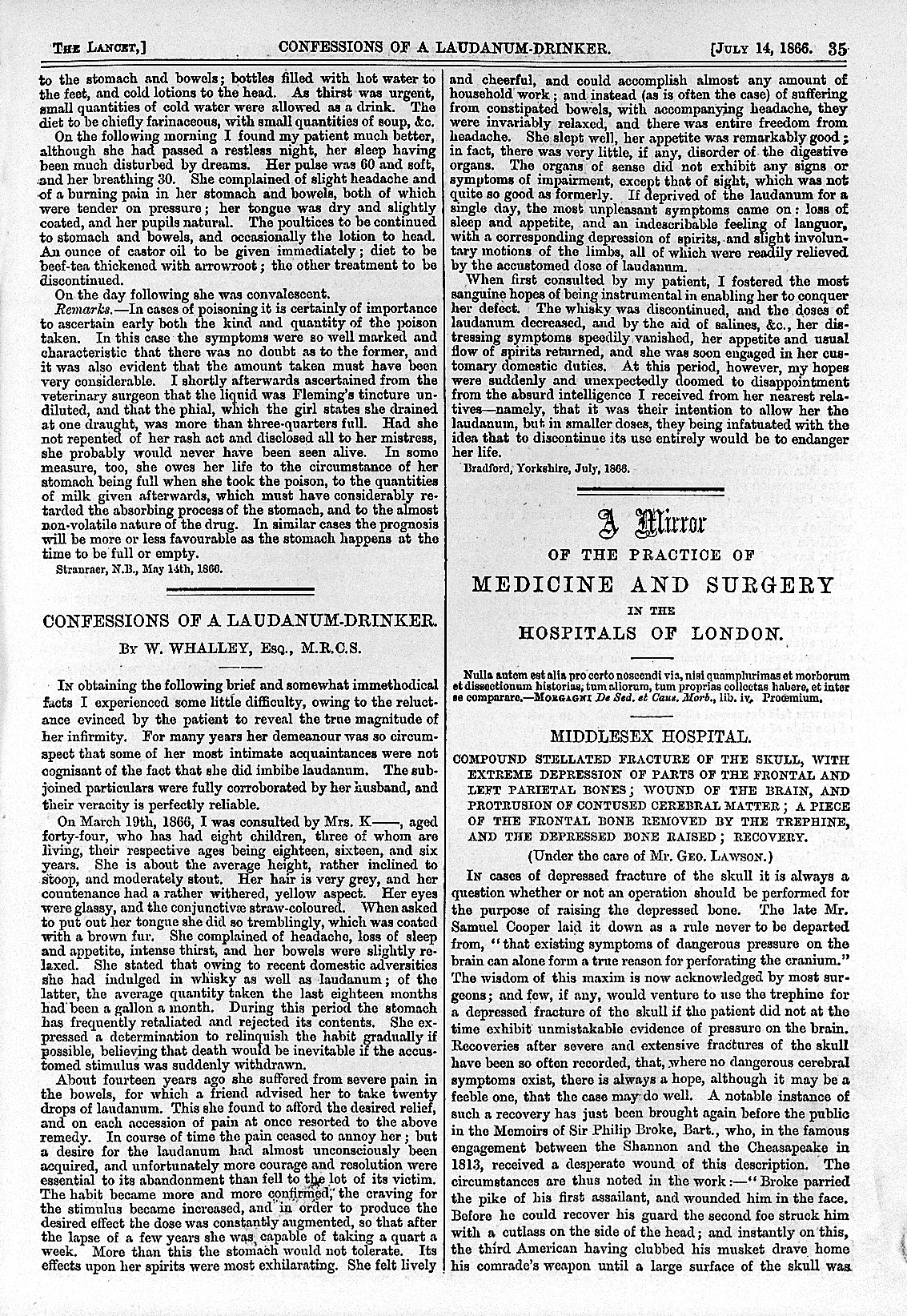
Confessions of a laudanum drinker, The Lancet, 1866

During the late 18th and early 19th centuries, patients undergoing surgery were often administered laudanum and alcohol, and had their hands restrained and bodies held down while the operation was performed.

=== 19th century ===
By the 19th century, laudanum was used in many patent medicines to "relieve pain ... to produce sleep ... to allay irritation ... to check excessive secretions ... to support the system ... [and] as a soporific". The limited pharmacopoeia of the day meant that opium derivatives were among the most effective of available treatments, so laudanum was widely prescribed for ailments from colds to meningitis to cardiac diseases, in both adults and children. Laudanum was used during the yellow fever epidemic.

Innumerable Victorian women were prescribed the drug for relief of menstrual cramps and vague aches. Nurses also spoon-fed laudanum to infants. The Romantic and Victorian eras were marked by the widespread use of laudanum in Europe and the United States. Mary Lincoln, for example, the wife of the US president Abraham Lincoln, was a laudanum addict, as was the English poet Samuel Taylor Coleridge, who was famously interrupted in the middle of an opium-induced writing session of "Kubla Khan" by "a person on business from Porlock". Initially a working-class drug, laudanum was cheaper than a bottle of gin or wine, because it was treated as a medication for legal purposes and not taxed as an alcoholic beverage.

As one researcher has noted: "To understand the popularity of a medicine that eased—even if only temporarily—coughing, diarrhoea and pain, one only has to consider the living conditions at the time". In the 1850s, "cholera and dysentery regularly ripped through communities, its victims often dying from debilitating diarrhoea", and dropsy, consumption, ague and rheumatism were all too common.

An 1869 article in Scientific American describes a farmer growing and harvesting poppy in Indian Springs, Georgia, and subsequently selling the raw material to a local pharmacist who prepared laudanum.

=== 20th century ===
Laudanum was used in home remedies and prescriptions, as well as a single medication. For example, a 1901 medical book published for home health use gave the following two "Simple Remedy Formulas" for "dysenterry" [sic]: (1) Thin boiled starch, 2 ounces; Laudanum, 20 drops; "Use as an injection [meaning as an enema] every six to twelve hours"; (2) Tincture rhubarb, 1 ounce; Laudanum 4 drachms; "Dose: One teaspoonful every three hours." In a section entitled "Professional Prescriptions" is a formula for "diarrhoea (acute)": Tincture opium, deodorized, 15 drops; Subnitrate of bismuth, 2 drachms; Simple syrup, 1/2 ounce; Chalk mixture, 1 1/2 ounces, "A teaspoonful every two or three hours to a child one year old." "Diarrhoea (chronic)": Aqueous extract of ergot, 20 grains; Extract of nux vomica, 5 grains; Extract of Opium, 10 grains, "Make 20 pills. Take one pill every three or four hours."

The early 20th century brought increased regulation of all manner of narcotics, including laudanum, as the addictive properties of opium became more widely understood, and "patent medicines came under fire, largely because of their mysterious compositions". In the US, the Pure Food and Drug Act of 1906 required that certain specified drugs, including alcohol, cocaine, heroin, morphine, and cannabis, be accurately labeled with contents and dosage. Previously many drugs had been sold as patent medicines with secret ingredients or misleading labels. Cocaine, heroin, cannabis, and other such drugs continued to be legally available without prescription as long as they were labeled. It is estimated that sale of patent medicines containing opiates decreased by 33% after labeling was mandated. In 1906 in Britain and in 1908 in Canada "laws requiring disclosure of ingredients and limitation of narcotic content were instituted".

The Harrison Narcotics Tax Act of 1914 restricted the manufacture and distribution of opiates, including laudanum, and coca derivatives in the US. This was followed by France's Loi des stupéfiants in 1916, and Britain's Dangerous Drugs Act in 1920.

Laudanum was supplied to druggists and physicians in regular and concentrated versions. For example, in 1915, Frank S. Betz Co., a medical supply company in Hammond, Indiana, advertised Tincture of Opium, U.S.P., for $2.90 per lb., Tincture of Opium Camphorated, U.S.P, for 85 cents per lb., and Tincture of Opium Deodorized, for $2.85 per lb. Four versions of opium as a fluid extract were also offered: (1) Opium, Concentrated (assayed) "For making Tincture Opii (Laudanum) U.S.P. Four times the strength of the regular U.S.P." tincture, for $9.35 per pint; (2) Opium, Camphorated Conc. "1 oz. making 8 ozs. Tr. Opii Camphorated U.S.P (Paregoric)" for $2.00 per pint; (3) Opium, Concentrated (Deodorized and Denarcotized) "Four times the strength of tincture, Used when Tinct. Opii U.S.P. is contraindicated" for $9.50 per pint, and (4) Opium (Aqueous), U.S.P., 1890, "Tr. (assayed) Papaver Somniferum" for $2.25 per pint.

In 1929–30, Parke, Davis & Co., a major US drug manufacturer based in Detroit, Michigan, sold "Opium, U.S.P. (Laudanum)", as Tincture No. 23, for $10.80 per pint (16 fluid ounces), and "Opium Camphorated, U.S.P. (Paregoric)", as Tincture No. 20, for $2.20 per pint. Concentrated versions were available. "Opium Camphorated, for U.S.P. Tincture: Liquid No. 338" was "exactly 8 times the strength of Tincture Opium Camphorated (Paregoric) [italics in original], U.S.P., "designed for preparing the tincture by direct dilution," and cost $7 per pint. Similarly, at a cost of $36 per pint, "Opium Concentrated, for U.S.P. Tincture: Liquid No. 336", was "four times the strength of the official tincture", and "designed for the extemporaneous preparation of the tincture". The catalog also noted: "For quarter-pint bottles add 80c. per pint to the price given for pints."

Toward the middle 20th century, the use of opiates was generally limited to the treatment of pain, and opium was no longer a medically accepted 'cure-all'. Further, the pharmaceutical industry began synthesizing various opioids, such as propoxyphene, oxymorphone and oxycodone. These synthetic opioids, along with codeine and morphine were preferable to laudanum since a single opioid could be prescribed for different types of pain rather than the 'cocktail of laudanum, which contains nearly all of the opium alkaloids. Consequently, laudanum became mostly obsolete as an analgesic, since its principal ingredient is morphine, which can be prescribed by itself to treat pain. Until now, there has been no medical consensus on which of the two (laudanum or morphine alone) is the better choice for treating pain.

In 1970, the US adopted the Uniform Controlled Substances Act, which regulated opium tincture (Laudanum) as a Schedule II substance (currently DEA #9630), placing even tighter controls on the drug.

By the late 20th century, laudanum's use was almost exclusively confined to treating severe diarrhea.

=== 21st century ===
The current prescribing information for laudanum in the US states that opium tincture's sole indication is as an anti-diarrheal, although the drug is occasionally prescribed off-label for treating pain and neonatal withdrawal syndrome.

== Historical varieties ==
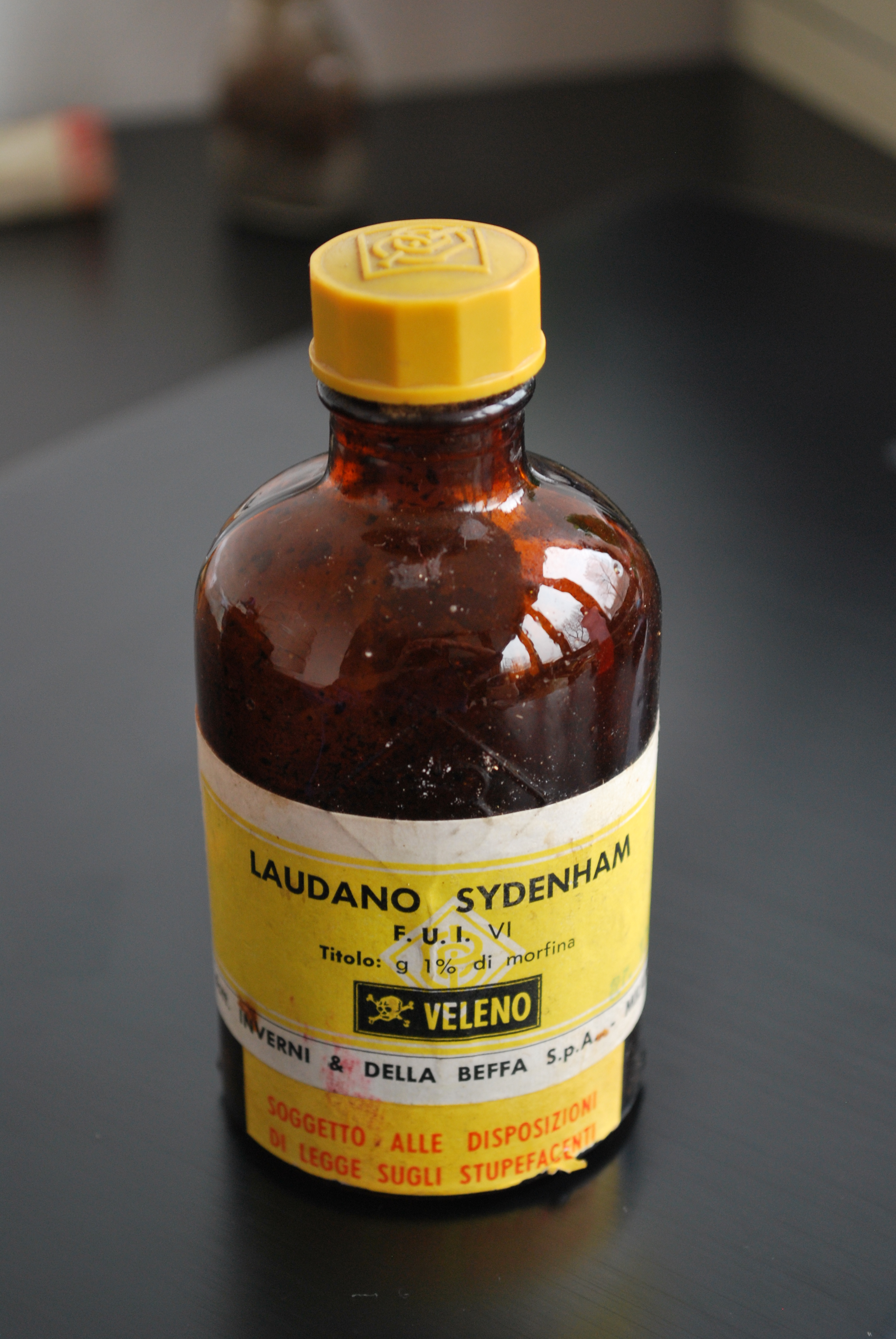
Italian Sydenham laudanum tincture from the 1950s

Several historical varieties of laudanum exist, including Paracelsus' laudanum, Sydenham's Laudanum (also known as tinctura opii crocata), benzoic laudanum (tinctura opii benzoica), and deodorized tincture of opium (the most common contemporary formulation), among others. Depending on the version, additional amounts of the substances and additional active ingredients (e.g. saffron, sugar, eugenol) are added, modifying its effects (e.g., amount of sedation, or antitussive properties).

There is probably no single reference that lists all the pharmaceutical variations of laudanum that were created and used in different countries during centuries since it was initially formulated. The reasons are that in addition to official variations described in pharmacopeias, pharmacists and drug manufacturers were free to alter such formulas. The alcohol content of Laudanum probably varied substantially; on the labels of turn-of-the-century bottles of Laudanum, alcoholic content is stated as 48%. In contrast, the current version of Laudanum contains about 18% alcohol.

The four variations of laudanum listed here were used in the United States during the late 19th century. The first, from an 1870 publication, is "Best Turkey opium 1 oz., slice, and pour upon it boiling water 1 gill, and work it in a bowl or mortar until it is dissolved; then pour it into the bottle, and with alcohol of 70 percent proof 1/2 pt., rinse the dish, adding the alcohol to the preparation, shaking well, and in 24 hours it will be ready for use. Dose—From 10 to 30 drops for adults, according to the strength of the patient, or severity of the pain. Thirty drops of this laudanum will be equal to one grain of opium. And this is a much better way to prepare it than putting the opium into alcohol, or any other spirits alone, for in that case much of the opium does not dissolve." The remaining three formulas are copied from an 1890 publication of the day:

1. Sydenham's Laudanum: "According to the Paris Codex this is prepared as follows: opium, 2 ounces; saffron, 1 ounce; bruised cinnamon and bruised cloves, each 1 drachm; sherry wine, 1 pint. Mix and macerate for 15 days and filter. Twenty drops are equal to one grain of opium."
2. Rousseau's Laudanum: "Dissolve 12 ounces white honey in 3 pounds warm water, and set it aside in a warm place. When fermentation begins add to it a solution of 4 ounces selected opium in 12 ounces water. Let the mixture stand for a month at a temperature of 86° Fahr.; then strain, filter, and evaporate to 10 ounces; finally strain and add 4 1/2 ounces proof alcohol. Seven drops of this preparation contain about 1 grain of opium."
3. Tincture of Opium (Laudanum), U.S.P., attributed to the United States Pharmacoepia of 1863: "Macerate 2 1/2 ounces opium, in moderately fine powder in 1 pint water for 3 days, with frequent agitation. Add 1 pint alcohol, and macerate for 3 days longer. Percolate, and displace 2 pints tincture by adding dilute alcohol in the percolator."

== Modern status ==
=== United Kingdom ===
Opium tincture remains in the British Pharmacopoeia, where it is referred to as Tincture of Opium, B.P., Laudanum, Thebaic Tincture or Tinctura Thebaica, and "adjusted to contain 1% w/v of anhydrous morphine." It is a Class A substance under the Misuse of Drugs Act of 1971. At least one manufacturer (Macfarlan Smith) still produces opium tincture in the UK as of 2011.

=== United States ===
Tincture of Opium is available by prescription in the United States. It is regulated as a Schedule II drug (No. 9639) under the Controlled Substances Act.

In the United States, opium tincture is marketed and distributed by several pharmaceutical firms, each producing a single formulation of the drug, which is deodorized. Each mL contains 10 mg of anhydrous morphine (the equivalent of 100 mg of powdered opium), other opium alkaloids (except noscapine), and ethanol, 19%. It is available packaged in bottles of four US fluid ounces (118 mL) and 16 US fluid ounces (1 US pt; 473 mL).

Tincture of Opium is known as one of many "unapproved drugs" regulated by the U.S. Food and Drug Administration (FDA); the marketing and distribution of opium tincture prevails only because opium tincture was sold prior to the Federal Food, Drug & Cosmetic Act of 1938. Its "grandfathered" status protects opium tincture from being required to undergo strict FDA drug reviews and subsequent approval processes. However, the FDA closely monitors the labeling of opium tincture. Bottles of opium tincture are required by the FDA to bear a bright red "POISON" label given the potency of the drug and the potential for overdose (see discussion about confusion with Paregoric below). Additionally, in a warning letter to a manufacturer of opium tincture in late 2009, the FDA noted that "we found that your firm is manufacturing and distributing the prescription drug Opium Tincture USP (Deodorized – 10 mg/mL). Based on our information, there are no FDA-approved applications on file for this drug product."

== Pharmacology ==
Opium tincture is useful as an analgesic and antidiarrheal. Opium enhances the tone in the long segments of the longitudinal muscle and inhibits propulsive contraction of circular and longitudinal muscles. The pharmacological effects of opium tincture are due principally to its morphine content. The quantity of the papaverine and codeine alkaloids in opium tincture is too small to have any demonstrable central nervous system effect.

Most modern formulations of opium tincture do not contain the alkaloid narcotine (also known as noscapine), which has antitussive properties. Even modest doses of narcotine can induce profound nausea and vomiting. Since opium tincture is usually prescribed for its antidiarrheal and analgesic properties (rather than as an antitussive), opium tincture without narcotine is generally preferred. This "de-narcotized" or "deodorized" opium tincture is formulated using a petroleum distillate to remove the narcotine.

Oral doses of opium tincture are rapidly absorbed in the gastrointestinal tract and metabolized in the liver. Peak plasma concentrations of the morphine content are reached in about one hour, and nearly 75% of the morphine content of the opium tincture is excreted in the urine within 48 hours after oral administration.

== Medical uses ==
=== Diarrhea ===
Opium tincture is indicated for the treatment of severe fulminant (intense, prolific) diarrhea that does not respond to standard therapy (e.g., Imodium or Lomotil). The usual starting dose is 0.3 mL to 0.6 mL (about six to 12 drops) in a glass of water or juice four times a day. Refractory cases (such as diarrhea resulting from the complications of HIV/AIDS) may require higher than normal dosing, for example, 1 to 2 mL every 3 hours, for a total daily dose of up to 16 mL a day. In terminal diseases, there is no ceiling dose for opium tincture; the dose is increased slowly until diarrhea is controlled.

=== Neonatal abstinence syndrome ===
Opium tincture is used to treat neonatal opioid withdrawal syndrome (NOWS) when diluted 1:25 (one part opium tincture to 25 parts water). The recommended dose is 0.2 mL of the diluted solution under the tongue every three hours, which may be increased by 0.05 mL every three hours until no objective signs of withdrawal are observed. In no event, however, should the dose exceed 0.7 mL every three hours. The opium tincture is gradually tapered over a 3- to 5-week period, at which point the newborn should be completely free of withdrawal symptoms.

== Hazards ==
=== Potency of laudanum ===
Opium tincture is one of the most potent oral formulations of morphine available by prescription. Accidental or deliberate overdose is easily possible with opium tincture given the highly concentrated nature of the solution. Overdose and death may occur with a single oral dose of between 100 and 150 mg of morphine in a healthy adult who has no tolerance to opiates. This represents the equivalent of between two and three teaspoons (10–15 mL) of opium tincture. Overdose of laudanum was an occurrence in the mid-19th century. Prudent medical judgment necessitates toward dispensing very small quantities of opium tincture in small dropper bottles or in pre-filled syringes to reduce the risk of intentional or accidental overdose.

=== Danger of confusion with paregoric ===
In the United States, opium tincture contains 10 mg per mL of anhydrous morphine. By contrast, opium tincture's weaker cousin, paregoric, also confusingly known as "camphorated tincture of opium", is 1/25th the strength of opium tincture, containing only 0.4 mg of morphine per mL. A 25-fold morphine overdose may occur if opium tincture is used where paregoric is indicated. Opium tincture is almost always dosed in drops, or fractions of a mL, or less commonly, in minims, while paregoric is dosed in teaspoons or tablespoons. Thus, an order for opium tincture containing directions in teaspoons is almost certainly in error. To avoid this potentially fatal outcome, the term "camphorated tincture of opium" is avoided in place of paregoric since the former can easily be mistaken for opium tincture.

In 2004, the FDA issued a "Patient Safety" news bulletin stating that "To help resolve the confusion [between opium tincture and paregoric], FDA will be working with the manufacturers of these two drugs to clarify the labeling on the containers and in the package inserts." Indeed, in 2005, labels for opium tincture began to include the concentration of morphine (10 mg/mL) in large text beneath the words "Opium Tincture". The FDA has also alerted pharmacists and other medical practitioners about the dangers of confusing these drugs, and has recommended that opium tincture not be stocked as a standard item (i.e., that it should not be "on the shelf"), that opium tincture be dispensed in oral syringes, and that pharmacy software alert the dispenser if unusually large doses of opium tincture appear to be indicated.

Despite the FDA's efforts over the past few years, the confusion persists, sometimes with deadly results. The Institute for Safe Medication Practices recommends that opium tincture not be stocked at all in a pharmacy's inventory, and that "It may be time to relegate opium tincture and paregoric to the museum of outmoded opioid therapy." Despite the risk of confusion, opium tincture, like many end-stage medications, is indispensable for intractable diarrhea for terminally ill patients, such as those with AIDS and cancer.

=== Misinterpretation of "DTO" ===
The abbreviation "DTO," traditionally used to refer to Deodorized Tincture of Opium, is sometimes also erroneously employed to abbreviate "diluted tincture of opium." Diluted tincture of opium, also known as Camphorated Tincture of Opium (Paregoric) is a 1:25 mixture of opium tincture to water prescribed to treat withdrawal symptoms in newborns whose mothers were using opioids while pregnant. The United States Pharmacopeia and FDA recommend that practitioners refrain from using DTO in prescriptions, given this potential for confusion. In cases where pharmacists have misinterpreted DTO, and given "deodorized tincture of opium" when "diluted tincture of opium" was meant, infants have received a massive 25-fold overdose of morphine, sometimes resulting in fatalities.

=== Side effects ===
Side effects of laudanum are generally the same as with morphine, and include euphoria, dysphoria, pruritus, sedation, constipation, reduced tidal volume, respiratory depression, as well as psychological dependence, physical dependence, miosis, and xerostomia. Overdose can result in severe respiratory depression or collapse and death. The ethanol component can also induce adverse effects at higher doses; the side effects are the same as with alcohol. Long-term use of laudanum in nonterminal diseases is discouraged due to the possibility of drug tolerance and addiction. Long-term use can also lead to abnormal liver function tests; specifically, prolonged morphine use can increase ALT and AST blood serum levels.

=== Treatment for overdose ===
Life-threatening overdose of opium tincture owes to the preparation's morphine content. Morphine produces a dose-dependent depressive effect on the respiratory system, which can lead to profound respiratory depression, hypoxia, coma and finally respiratory arrest and death. If overdose of opium tincture is suspected, rapid professional intervention is required. The primary concern is re-establishing a viable airway and institution of assisted or controlled ventilation if the patient is unable to breathe on their own. Other supportive measures such as the use of vasopressors and oxygen may be indicated to treat cardiac and/or pulmonary failure. Cardiac arrhythmias or arrest will require advanced life-saving measures.

Intravenous naloxone or nalmefene, quick-acting opioid antagonists, are the first-line treatment to reverse respiratory depression caused by an overdose of opium tincture. Gastric lavage may be of some use in certain cases.

== Fiction ==
=== Literature ===
- In Mary Shelley's novel Frankenstein (1818), Victor Frankenstein takes laudanum as his only means of sleeping and thus preserving his life while in recovery from months of fever and a series of horrible events.
- A laudanum-addicted character also appeared in Wilkie Collins' novel Armadale (1864–1866).
- Wilkie Collins' novel The Moonstone (1868) features laudanum "as an essential ingredient of the plot." Collins based his description of the drug's effects on his own experiences with it.
- Laudanum appears in Charles Baudelaire's prose poem The Double Room, published in his collection Le Spleen de Paris in 1869.
- Laudanum is portrayed as the surgical drug of choice for fifteenth-century physicians in Lawrence Schoonover's novel The Burnished Blade (1948), the plot of which deals in part with the smuggling of expensive raw opium into France from the Empire of Trebizond.
- Stephen Maturin, one of the main characters in Patrick O'Brian's Aubrey–Maturin series of novels (1969–2004) about the Napoleonic wars, is a sometime laudanum addict.

== See also ==
- Confessions of an English Opium-Eater
- Kendal Black Drop
- Paregoric
- Poppy tea
