= ATC code A07 =

ATC code A07 Antidiarrheals, intestinal anti-inflammatory/anti-infective agents is a therapeutic subgroup of the Anatomical Therapeutic Chemical Classification System, a system of alphanumeric codes developed by the World Health Organization (WHO) for the classification of drugs and other medical products. Subgroup A07 is part of the anatomical group A Alimentary tract and metabolism.

Codes for veterinary use (ATCvet codes) can be created by placing the letter Q in front of the human ATC code: for example, QA07. ATCvet codes without corresponding human ATC codes are cited with the leading Q in the following list.
National versions of the ATC classification may include additional codes not present in this list, which follows the WHO version.

== A07A Intestinal anti-infectives ==
=== A07AA Antibiotics ===
List from 01-54

A07AA01 Neomycin
A07AA02 Nystatin
A07AA03 Natamycin
A07AA04 Streptomycin
A07AA05 Polymyxin B
A07AA06 Paromomycin
A07AA07 Amphotericin B
A07AA08 Kanamycin
A07AA09 Vancomycin
A07AA10 Colistin
A07AA11 Rifaximin
A07AA12 Fidaxomicin
A07AA13 Rifamycin
A07AA51 Neomycin, combinations
A07AA54 Streptomycin, combinations

QA07AA90 Dihydrostreptomycin
QA07AA91 Gentamicin
QA07AA92 Apramycin
QA07AA93 Bacitracin
QA07AA94 Enramycin
QA07AA95 Avilamycin
QA07AA96 Bambermycin
QA07AA98 Colistin, combinations with other antibacterials
QA07AA99 Antibiotics, combinations

=== A07AB Sulfonamides ===
A07AB02 Phthalylsulfathiazole
A07AB03 Sulfaguanidine
A07AB04 Succinylsulfathiazole
QA07AB20 Sulfonamides, combinations
QA07AB90 Formosulfathiazole
QA07AB92 Phthalylsulfathiazole, combinations
QA07AB99 Combinations

=== A07AC Imidazole derivatives ===
A07AC01 Miconazole

=== A07AX Other intestinal anti-infectives ===
A07AX01 Broxyquinoline
A07AX02 Acetarsol
A07AX03 Nifuroxazide
A07AX04 Nifurzide
QA07AX90 Poly(2-propenal, 2-propenoic acid)
QA07AX91 Halquinol

== A07B Intestinal adsorbents ==
=== A07BA Charcoal preparations ===
A07BA01 Medicinal charcoal
A07BA51 Medicinal charcoal, combinations

=== A07BC Other intestinal adsorbents ===
A07BC01 Pectin
A07BC02 Kaolin
A07BC03 Crospovidone
A07BC04 Attapulgite
A07BC05 Diosmectite
A07BC30 Combinations
A07BC54 Attapulgite, combinations

== A07C Electrolytes with carbohydrates ==
=== A07CA Oral rehydration salt formulations ===
Subgroup A07CA is only included in the human ATC classification.

=== QA07CQ Oral rehydration formulations for veterinary use ===
QA07CQ01 Oral electrolytes
QA07CQ02 Oral electrolytes and carbohydrates

== A07D Antipropulsives ==
=== A07DA Antipropulsives ===
A07DA01 Diphenoxylate
A07DA02 Opium
A07DA03 Loperamide
A07DA04 Difenoxin
A07DA05 Loperamide oxide
A07DA06 Eluxadoline
A07DA52 Morphine, combinations
A07DA53 Loperamide, combinations

== A07E Intestinal anti-inflammatory agents ==
=== A07EA Corticosteroids acting locally ===
A07EA01 Prednisolone
A07EA02 Hydrocortisone
A07EA03 Prednisone
A07EA04 Betamethasone
A07EA05 Tixocortol
A07EA06 Budesonide
A07EA07 Beclometasone

=== A07EB Antiallergic agents, excluding corticosteroids ===
A07EB01 Cromoglicic acid

=== A07EC Aminosalicylic acid and similar agents ===
A07EC01 Sulfasalazine
A07EC02 Mesalazine
A07EC03 Olsalazine
A07EC04 Balsalazide

== A07F Antidiarrheal micro-organisms ==
=== A07FA Antidiarrheal micro-organisms ===
A07FA01 Lactic acid producing organisms
A07FA02 Saccharomyces boulardii
A07FA03 Escherichia coli
A07FA51 Lactic acid producing organisms, combinations
QA07FA90 Probiotics

== A07X Other antidiarrheals ==
=== A07XA Other antidiarrheals ===
A07XA01 Albumin tannate
A07XA02 Ceratonia
A07XA03 Calcium compounds
A07XA04 Racecadotril
A07XA06 Crofelemer
A07XA51 Albumin tannate, combinations
QA07XA90 Aluminium salicylates, basic
QA07XA91 Zinc oxide
QA07XA92 Zinc disodium edetate
QA07XA99 Other antidiarrheals, combinations
