= Giaconda =

- Founded: 2004
- Founder: Thomas Borody
- Headquarters: Sydney, Australia
- Key people: Patrick McLean (CEO)
- Website: www.giacondaltd.com

Giaconda is an Australian biotechnology company headquartered in Sydney. The company was founded in 2004 to commercialise a number of drug combinations developed by Professor Thomas Borody, a Sydney-based gastroenterologist.

== History ==
Giaconda was named after the Giaconda Winery, which is located nine kilometres south-west of Beechworth in the northeastern part of the Australian state of Victoria. That vineyard in turn derives its name from La Gioconda, which is a nickname for the Mona Lisa of Leonardo da Vinci. Giaconda uses a stylised version of the Mona Lisa in its company logo.

Giaconda's CEO is Mr Patrick McLean, a Canadian who was previously senior vice-president European Commercial Operations of the Montreal-based Axcan Pharma. Giaconda was a public company whose stock was traded on the Australian Securities Exchange under the stock code GIA. The company completed an initial public offering in September 2005, issuing 12 million shares at 50 Australian cents each. Thomas Borody currently owns around 70% of the stock.

In August 2010 it sold the patents for Myoconda, Heliconda and Picoconda to RedHill Biopharma "Giaconda completes sale of 3 products to RedHill Biopharma". 31 August 2010. Archived from the original on 2 April 2015.

The company went into voluntary administration in February 2011.

== Products ==
Giaconda worked on five products, all of which were given names ending in '-conda'.

Myoconda, the company's lead product, is a combination of the antibiotics rifabutin, clarithromycin and clofazimine. The combination is envisaged as a new treatment for Crohn's disease. Myoconda was first devised by Thomas Borody around 1997. The product has its origins in Borody's view that Crohn's disease is caused by infection with the bacterium Mycobacterium avium paratuberculosis, and that the disease can therefore be fought using drugs effective against the bacterium, such as those used in Myoconda. In 2000 Borody's organisation granted Pharmacia an option to license the Myoconda patent in return for that company agreeing to conduct a Phase III clinical trial. The results of a Phase II trial were published in 2002. The Phase III trial in 213 Crohn's patients was completed in September 2004 was results announced in 2005, however by this stage Pharmacia had merged with Pfizer and the latter company had decided not to exercise its Myoconda option. A non-binding letter of intent was signed in April 2006 with Forest Laboratories for the UK and Irish market. A second Phase III trial is planned, and Giaconda hoped to be able to launch the product in the United States in 2008.

Hepaconda is a product for the treatment of Hepatitis C infection. The product, a combination of bezafibrate with chenodeoxycholic acid, was invented in 2001. Hepaconda is being developed as a 'rescue therapy' for Hepatitis C patients that have exhausted other treatment options. It is also envisaged that Hepaconda could be used to treat primary biliary cirrhosis and non-alcoholic steatohepatitis. Giaconda had initially envisaged using ursodeoxycholic acid as the bile acid in Hepaconda, but in 2006 the company shifted its attention to the use of chenodeoxycholic acid, having decided that its patent protection extended to all bile acid / fibrate combinations other than bezafibrate plus ursodoxycholic acid.

Heliconda, a product for the treatment of drug-resistant Helicobacter pylori, is a combination of the antibiotics rifabutin and amoxicillin and the proton pump inhibitor drug pantoprazole. Heliconda was invented in 1998. In 2006 the results of a Phase II study of Heliconda in around 130 patients with resistant H. pylori infection was published. This study demonstrated an eradication of the infection in 90.9% of patients treated with Heliconda.

Ibaconda is a product for the treatment of constipation-predominant irritable bowel syndrome. The product, invented by Thomas Borody in 1997, is a combination of the anti-inflammatory drug olsalazine and the anti-gout drug colchicine.

Picoconda is a bowel preparation for use in gastrointestinal tract procedures. This product was invented by Thomas Borody in 1995. It represents an attempt to replace conventional bowel preparations, which are often considered unpalatable. The product contains a laxative called sodium picosulphate, but capsulised and mixed with electrolytes so that it is palatable.
