= Sulfaguanidine =

Chemical compound

Clinical data
- AHFS/Drugs.com: International Drug Names
- ATC code: A07AB03 (WHO)

Identifiers
- IUPAC name: 4-Amino-N-[amino(imino)methyl]benzenesulfonamide
- CAS Number: 57-67-0
- PubChem CID: 5324
- ChemSpider: 5133
- UNII: 15XQ8043FN
- KEGG: D02437
- CompTox Dashboard (EPA): DTXSID1023609
- ECHA InfoCard: 100.000.314

Chemical and physical data
- Formula: C_{7}H_{10}N_{4}O_{2}S
- Molar mass: 214.24 g·mol^{−1}
- 3D model (JSmol): Interactive image
- Melting point: 190 to 193 °C (374 to 379 °F)
- SMILES: c1cc(N)ccc1S(=O)(=O)N=C(N)N
- InChI: InChI=1S/C7H10N4O2S/c8-5-1-3-6(4-2-5)14(12,13)11-7(9)10/h1-4H,8H2,(H4,9,10,11); Key:BRBKOPJOKNSWSG-UHFFFAOYSA-N

Sulfaguanidine is a sulfonamide.

Sulfaguanidine is a guanidine derivative of sulfanilamide used in veterinary medicine. Sulfaguanidine is poorly absorbed from the gut which makes it suitable for the treatment of bacillary dysentery and other enteric infections.

Sulphaguanidine (II) was independently prepared by Marshall, Bratton, White, and Litchfield and Roblin, Williams, Winnek, and English in 1940, and introduced for the treatment of bacillary dysentery on the basis of its poor absorption from the gut. Its orally administered route of administration is now well established.
