= NALF2 =

Protein-coding gene in humans

Identifiers
- Aliases: NALF2, CXorf63, TED, TMEM28, bB57D9.1, family with sequence similarity 155 member B, FAM155B, NALCN channel auxiliary factor 2
- External IDs: MGI: 3648377; GeneCards: NALF2

Gene location (Human)
Chr.	X chromosome (human)
Band	Xq13.1	Start	69,504,326 bp
Band	Xq13.1	End	69,532,508 bp

Gene location (Mouse)
Chr.	X chromosome (mouse)
Band	X|X C3	Start	98,864,627 bp
Band	X|X C3	End	98,892,396 bp
RNA expression pattern
Bgee	Human / Mouse (ortholog); Top expressed in: cardiac muscle tissue of right atrium; right auricle of heart; apex of heart; myocardium of left ventricle; gonad; optic nerve; vena cava; testicle; right lobe of thyroid gland; seminal vesicula / Top expressed in: dentate gyrus of hippocampal formation granule cell; hippocampus proper; striatum of neuraxis; tail of embryo; epiblast; primary visual cortex; olfactory bulb; hypothalamus; ganglionic eminence; cerebellar cortex; More reference expression data
BioGPS	n/a
Gene ontology
Molecular function	stretch-activated, cation-selective, calcium channel activity
Cellular component	membrane; integral component of membrane; plasma membrane
Biological process	calcium ion import across plasma membrane
Sources:Amigo / QuickGO
Orthologs
Databases	NCBI: entry; OMA: entry
Species	Human	Mouse
Entrez	27112	620592
Ensembl	ENSG00000130054	ENSMUSG00000071719
UniProt	O75949	A2BDP1
RefSeq (mRNA)	NM_015686	NM_001081283
RefSeq (protein)	NP_056501	NP_001074752
Location (UCSC)	Chr X: 69.5 – 69.53 Mb	Chr X: 98.86 – 98.89 Mb
PubMed search
- Wikidata
View/Edit Human	View/Edit Mouse

NALCN channel auxiliary factor 2 is a protein in humans that is encoded by the NALF2 gene (previously FAM155B). The NALF2 protein is thought to be part of the NALCN channel complex, similar to its paralog NALF1. The NALCN complex is a voltage-gated ion channel which affects neuronal excitability through regulation of the membrane resting potential.

== Gene ==
FAM155B is located on the X chromosome at the position Xq13.1. It is found on the positive strand from nucleotides 69504326-69532508. Genetic neighbors include the gene EDA (ectodysplasin A) downstream and a long intergenic non-protein coding RNA upstream. The full gene transcript sequence of this gene is 3528 bp long with a coding sequence of 1418 bp. This transcript includes 3 exons and 2 introns.

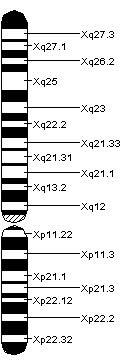
The locus of FAM155B is Xq13.1.

Aliases of FAM155B are TMEM28, cXorf63, and TED.

== mRNA ==
The FAM155B gene has 2 known isoforms.

The transcript of isoform 1 is 4685 bp long with a coding sequence of 1022 bp. It has a 5' UTR consisting of 79 bp and a 3' UTR with 3583 bp.

The transcript of isoform 2 is much shorter at 975 bp with a coding sequence of 878 bp. It also has a 5' UTR of 79 bp, but the 3' UTR is simply 17 bp.

== Protein ==
=== Composition ===
The protein sequence of FAM155B is 472 amino acids long. The molecular weight is predicted to be 52.5 kDa and the isoelectric point is estimated to be 8.2. The most prominent amino acids are Leucine (L) and Proline (P) as they account for 11.4% and 10% of the protein respectively. In terms of amino acid grouping, the most common ones are AGP, LVIFM, and KRED at 24.8%, 22.2%, and 21%. This protein lacks charged segments or charge clusters.

There are 2 protein isoforms for FAM155B. Isoform 1 is 340 amino acids long while isoform 2 is composed of 292 amino acids.

=== Domains ===
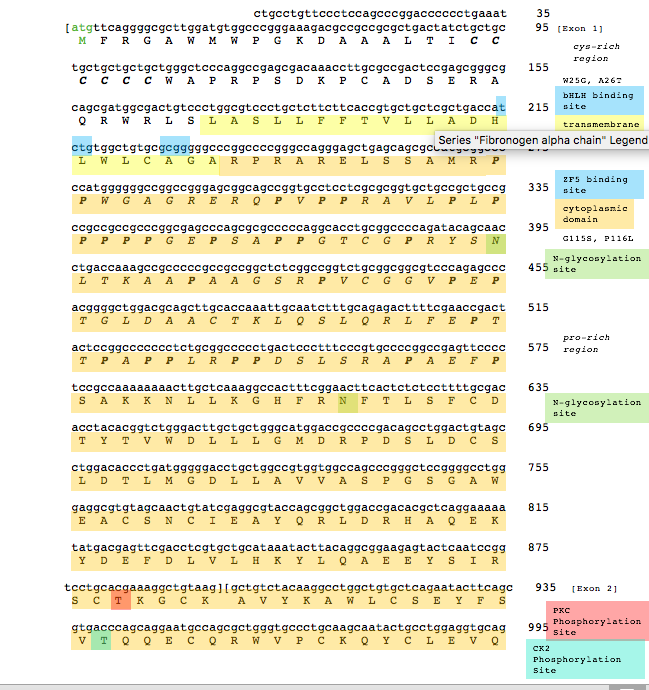
FAM155B Conceptual Translation Part 1

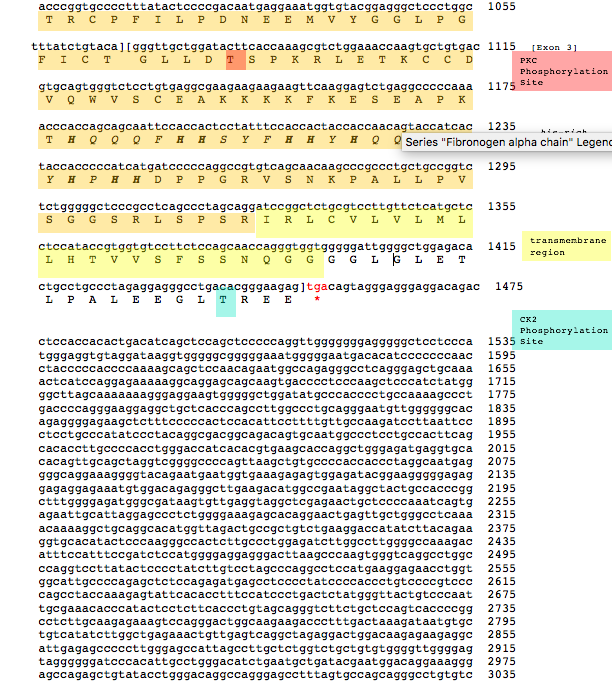
FAM155B Conceptual Translation Part 2

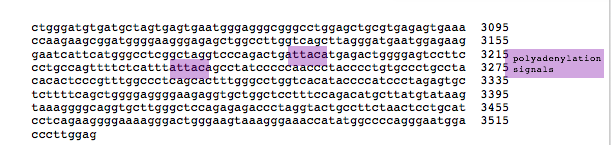
FAM155B Conceptual Translation Part 3

FAM155B has two transmembrane domains which suggests that it is a multi-pass membrane protein. It also has a cytoplasmic domain located right between the two transmembrane domains and three compositionally biased regions. A cysteine-rich region is located at the beginning of the sequence followed by a proline-rich region and a histidine-rich region much later in the sequence.

=== Secondary structure ===
This protein is predicted to have 9 beta sheets, 16 alpha helices, and 2 transmembrane helices.

=== Tertiary structure ===
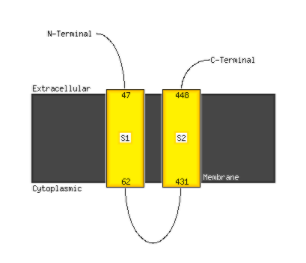
Membrane topology prediction for FAM155B.

In terms of membrane topology, the N- and C-termini appear to be located extracellularly while the protein sequence between the transmembrane domains appears to be located in the cytoplasmic region.

== Regulation ==
=== DNA-level regulation ===
The only regulatory element is a promoter region that is located about 2303 bp upstream from the transcriptional start site. There is one DNAse hypersensitivity cluster and one CpG island associated with the promoter region. There is low signal strength among cell lines among both H3K4me3 and H3K27Ac tracks. The H3k4me1 track exhibit relatively higher signals in the NHEK and H1-hESC cell lines. Multiple transcription factors binding sites are associated with the promoter such as ERE, C2H2, and TFIIB.

=== RNA-level regulation ===
There are no known miRNA target sites in FAM155B. Many stem-loop structures are predicted from the 3' UTR of human FAM155B and close orthologs. This indicates some conservation of secondary mRNA structures among different species.

=== Protein-level regulation ===
==== Localization ====
Human FAM155B along with closely related orthologs are most likely to be localized in the endoplasmic reticulum with a prediction of 34.8%. Following this, the protein is likely to be found in the plasma membrane with a prediction of 21.7%.

==== Post-translational modification ====
FAM155B has two proposed N-Glycosylation sites at Asparagine 120 and 193. There do not appear to be any significant O-Glycosylation sites. There are two CKII phosphorylation sites at Threonine 302 and 469 along with two PKC phosphorylation sites at 283 and 349. A sumoylation analysis identified two motifs with low probability scores of 0.5 and 0.13. Since the probability scores are low, this indicates that FAM155B is unlikely to have any true sumoylation motifs.

== Expression ==
Highest expression is observed in the heart, thyroid, and brain tissues from RNA sequencing of human tissues. Specifically, fetal brain tissue and the cerebellum are observed to have higher expression than the brain as a whole. In regards to fetal tissue, high expression of the heart was observed at 11 weeks while the stomach and intestine are expressed highly at 20 weeks. The kidney is also expressed relatively highly at 10 weeks. This implies that expression in tissues like the stomach, intestine, and kidneys decreases as fetal development continues.

== Homology ==
=== Orthologs ===
FAM155B has many orthologs found exclusively within the phylum Metazoa. This indicates that FAM155B isn't conserved in life forms such as plants, protists, fungi, bacteria, and archaea. Within Metazoa, very few orthologs are found outside of the subphylum Vertebrata—implying that the majority of FAM155B orthologs are vertebrates. The most distant ortholog detected is Actinia tenebrosa (Australian Red Waratah Sea Anemone). Closely related orthologs include primates, rodents, and African mammals while moderately related orthologs include birds, reptiles, and amphibians. The distantly related orthologs include bony fish and the sea anemone.

=== Paralog ===
There is one human paralog for this gene, FAM155A. The amino acid identity between the two paralogs is 46.29%. Like its paralog, FAM155A is also conserved in animals within the phylum Metazoa. However, FAM155A is conserved in more invertebrates than FAM155B which implies that the original gene may have split in an invertebrate ancestor about 824 MYA.

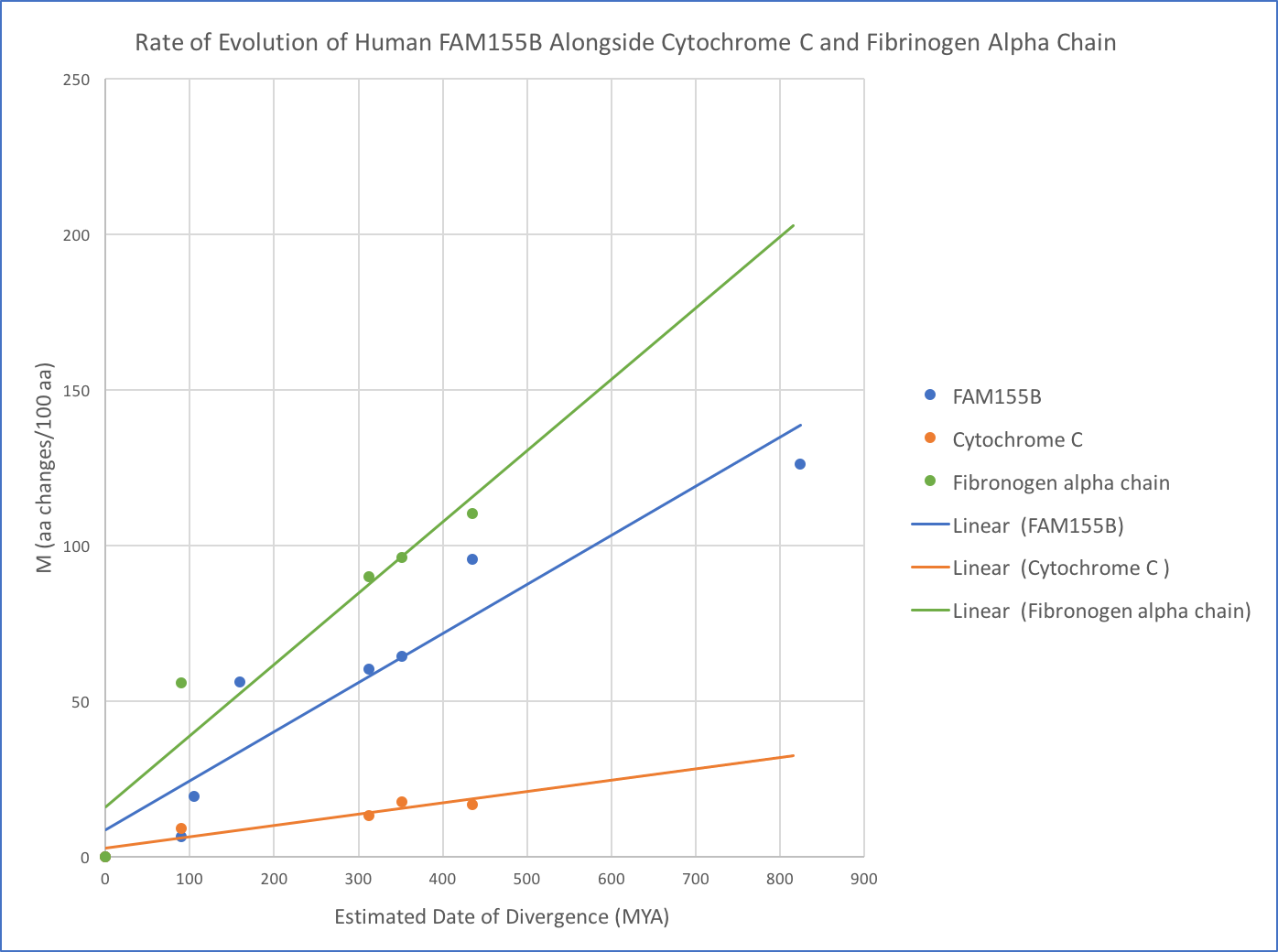
FAM155B appears to be evolving at a rate halfway between that of human Cytochrome C and Fibrinogen alpha chain.

=== Evolutionary history ===
This gene seems to have first appeared in Cnidaria about 824 MYA. It then appeared in bony fish about 435 MYA. It is first noted in vertebrates (specifically amphibians) around 351.8 MYA and about 159 MYA in mammals.

== Function ==
The function of FAM155B is poorly understood by the scientific community. However, it may be involved in immune function as it has been found to interact with elements of the immune system.

== Interacting proteins ==
Predicted functional partners of FAM155B include C3, SH2B3, and C1R—all of which are associated with immune functions. C3 and C1R are involved in the complement system while SH2B3 is a protein which links the T-cell receptor signal to the phospholipase GRB2 and PI3K. FAM155B may also interact with AGBL4 and AGBL5 which are metallocarboxypeptidases that mediate protein deglutamylation.

== Clinical significance ==
FAM155B is differentially expressed under many circumstances which indicates that it may be associated with various diseases. Significantly decreased expression of FAM155B has been noted in MCF7 human breast cancer cell lines when the estrogen receptor is silenced. Another study observed that this gene was overexpressed in breast cancer cell lines under normal circumstances which reinforced the association with breast cancer. In addition, FAM155B was found to be one of the key candidate genes distinctive to the B-type Raf (BRAF) kinase mutation in papillary thyroid cancer. It was differently expressed in the wild-type compared to the mutant form
