= Bezafibrate =

Chemical compound

Clinical data
- AHFS/Drugs.com: International Drug Names
- MedlinePlus: a682711
- Routes of administration: Oral
- ATC code: C10AB02 (WHO)

Legal status
- Legal status: UK: POM (Prescription only); US: ℞-only

Identifiers
- IUPAC name: 2-(4-{2-[(4-chlorobenzoyl)amino]ethyl}phenoxy)-2-methylpropanoic acid
- CAS Number: 41859-67-0
- PubChem CID: 39042
- IUPHAR/BPS: 2668
- DrugBank: DB01393
- ChemSpider: 35728
- UNII: Y9449Q51XH
- KEGG: D01366
- ChEBI: CHEBI:47612
- ChEMBL: ChEMBL264374
- CompTox Dashboard (EPA): DTXSID3029869
- ECHA InfoCard: 100.050.498

Chemical and physical data
- Formula: C_{19}H_{20}ClNO_{4}
- Molar mass: 361.82 g·mol^{−1}
- 3D model (JSmol): Interactive image
- SMILES: O=C(c1ccc(Cl)cc1)NCCc2ccc(OC(C(=O)O)(C)C)cc2
- InChI: InChI=1S/C19H20ClNO4/c1-19(2,18(23)24)25-16-9-3-13(4-10-16)11-12-21-17(22)14-5-7-15(20)8-6-14/h3-10H,11-12H2,1-2H3,(H,21,22)(H,23,24); Key:IIBYAHWJQTYFKB-UHFFFAOYSA-N

Bezafibrate (marketed as Bezalip and various other brand names) is a fibrate drug used as a lipid-lowering agent to treat hyperlipidaemia. It helps to lower LDL cholesterol and triglyceride in the blood, and increase HDL.

It was patented in 1971 and approved for medical use in 1978.

== Medical uses ==
Bezafibrate improves markers of combined hyperlipidemia, effectively reducing LDL and triglycerides and improving HDL levels. The main effect on cardiovascular morbidity is in patients with the metabolic syndrome, the features of which are attenuated by bezafibrate. Studies show that in patients with impaired glucose tolerance, bezafibrate may delay progress to diabetes, and in those with insulin resistance it slowed progress in the HOMA severity marker. In addition, a prospective observational study of dyslipidemic patients with diabetes or hyperglycemia showed that bezafibrate significantly reduces haemoglobin A1c (HbA1c) concentration as a function of baseline HbA1c levels, regardless of concurrent use of antidiabetic drugs.

== Side effects ==
The main toxicity is hepatic (abnormal liver enzymes); myopathy and on rare occasions rhabdomyolysis have been reported.

== Other uses ==
The Australian biotech company Giaconda combines bezafibrate with chenodeoxycholic acid in an anti-hepatitis C drug combination called Hepaconda.

Bezafibrate has been shown to reduce tau protein hyperphosphorylation and other signs of tauopathy in transgenic mice having human tau mutation.

The combination of a cholesterol-lowering drug, bezafibrate, and a contraceptive steroid, medroxyprogesterone acetate, could be an effective, non-toxic treatment for a range of cancers, researchers at the University of Birmingham have found.

== Mode of action ==
Like the other fibrates, bezafibrate is an agonist of PPARα; some studies suggest it may have some activity on PPARγ and PPARδ as well.

== Synthesis ==
Further evidence that substantial bulk tolerance is available in the para position is given by the lipid lowering agent bezafibrate.

Bezafibrate synthesis:

The p-chlorobenzamide of tyramine undergoes a Williamson ether synthesis with ethyl 2-bromo-2-methylpropionate to complete the synthesis. The ester group is hydrolyzed in the alkaline reaction medium.

== History ==
Bezafibrate was first introduced by Boehringer Mannheim in 1977.
