= Phthalylsulfathiazole =

Chemical compound

Clinical data
- AHFS/Drugs.com: International Drug Names
- ATC code: A07AB02 (WHO)

Identifiers
- IUPAC name: 2-[({4-[(1,3-Thiazol-2-ylamino)sulfonyl]phenyl}amino)carbonyl]benzoic acid
- CAS Number: 85-73-4
- PubChem CID: 4806
- DrugBank: DB13248
- ChemSpider: 4641
- UNII: 6875L5852V
- KEGG: D02440
- ChEMBL: ChEMBL1524273
- CompTox Dashboard (EPA): DTXSID8023470
- ECHA InfoCard: 100.001.480

Chemical and physical data
- Formula: C_{17}H_{13}N_{3}O_{5}S_{2}
- Molar mass: 403.43 g·mol^{−1}
- 3D model (JSmol): Interactive image
- SMILES: C1=CC=C(C(=C1)C(=O)NC2=CC=C(C=C2)S(=O)(=O)NC3=NC=CS3)C(=O)O
- InChI: InChI=1S/C17H13N3O5S2/c21-15(13-3-1-2-4-14(13)16(22)23)19-11-5-7-12(8-6-11)27(24,25)20-17-18-9-10-26-17/h1-10H,(H,18,20)(H,19,21)(H,22,23); Key:PBMSWVPMRUJMPE-UHFFFAOYSA-N

Phthalylsulfathiazole (also known as sulfathalidine) is a sulfonamide broad-spectrum antimicrobial used primarily for treating gastrointestinal infections.

== Medical uses ==
Phthalylsulfathiazole is indicated for treating various intestinal conditions, including dysentery, colitis, gastroenteritis, and for preoperative preparation in intestinal surgery. It may be administered in combination with other antimicrobials such as metronidazole, furazolidone, or neomycin for enhanced efficacy.

Like all antibiotics, phthalylsulfathiazole should be carefully monitored to avoid promoting bacterial resistance.

=== Available forms ===
Phthalylsulfathiazole is typically given orally in tablet form to target intestinal infections directly. Due to the phthalic acid substitution on the aniline nitrogen, it remains unabsorbed in the bloodstream, focusing its action within the gut.

== Adverse Effects ==
Common side effects include nausea, stomach upset, and skin rash. Rare but serious adverse effects may involve vitamin B deficiency, agranulocytosis, or aplastic anemia.

== Mechanism of action ==
Phthalylsulfathiazole acts by competitive antagonism with para-aminobenzoic acid, inhibiting the dihydropteroate synthetase enzyme crucial for dihydrofolic acid synthesis. This inhibition disrupts purine and pyrimidine synthesis, impairing bacterial growth and reproduction. Once in the large intestine, phthalylsulfathiazole hydrolyzes to release sulfathiazole, the active antimicrobial component.
