= Succinylsulfathiazole =

Chemical compound

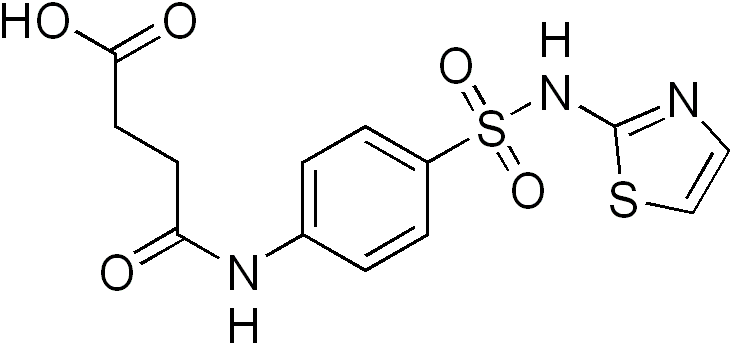

Clinical data
- ATC code: A07AB04 (WHO)

Identifiers
- IUPAC name: 4-oxo-4-({4-[(1,3-thiazol-2-ylamino)sulfonyl]phenyl}amino)butanoic acid
- CAS Number: 116-43-8
- PubChem CID: 5315
- UNII: RSS8647O4S
- KEGG: D07060
- ChEMBL: ChEMBL1484857
- CompTox Dashboard (EPA): DTXSID7045281
- ECHA InfoCard: 100.003.765

Chemical and physical data
- Formula: C_{13}H_{13}N_{3}O_{5}S_{2}
- Molar mass: 355.38 g·mol^{−1}
- 3D model (JSmol): Interactive image
- SMILES: OC(=O)CCC(=O)Nc1ccc(cc1)S(=O)(=O)Nc2nccs2

Succinylsulfathiazole (also known as sulfasuxidine) is a sulfonamide. It is also spelled as succinylsulphathiazole. It is a white or yellow-white crystalline powder. It dissolves in aqueous solutions of alkali hydroxides and carbonates but is very slightly soluble in water.

It is classified as ultra long-acting drug. About 95% of the drug remains in the intestine and only 5% is hydrolyzed, slowly, to sulfathiazole and is absorbed.

The drug is used for its antibacterial activity in the GIT. The dose is 10g - 20g daily in divided doses.

The Succinyl group is attached to form a prodrug for the controlled release of the drug sulfathiazole.
