= Enramycin =

Chemical compound

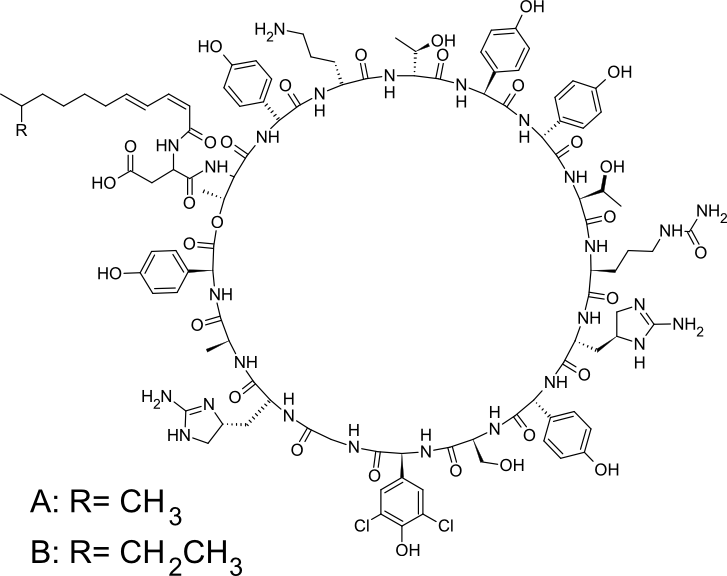

Clinical data
- ATCvet code: QA07AA94 (WHO)

Identifiers
- CAS Number: 11115-82-5
- PubChem CID: 56842192
- ChemSpider: 57564094
- UNII: 4GP7CLG9EG
- CompTox Dashboard (EPA): DTXSID10718649

Chemical and physical data
- Formula: C_{107}H_{138}Cl_{2}N_{26}O_{31}
- Molar mass: 2355.33 g·mol^{−1}
- 3D model (JSmol): Interactive image
- SMILES: CCC(C)CCCC/C=C/C=C/C(=O)NC(CC(=O)O)C(=O)NC1C(OC(=O)C(NC(=O)C(NC(=O)C(NC(=O)NC(=O)C(NC(=O)C(NC(=O)C(NC(=O)C(NC(=O)C(NC(=O)C(NC(=O)C(NC(=O)C(NC(=O)C(NC(=O)N(C(=O)C(NC1=O)C2=CC=C(C=C2)O)CCCCN)C(C)O)C3=CC=C(C=C3)O)C4=CC=C(C=C4)O)C(C)O)CCCNC(=O)N)CC5CNC(=N5)N)C6=CC=C(C=C6)O)CO)C7=CC(=C(C(=C7)Cl)O)Cl)CC8CNC(=N8)N)C)C9=CC=C(C=C9)O)C.O
- InChI: InChI=1S/C107H138Cl2N26O31.H2O/c1-7-51(2)17-12-10-8-9-11-13-19-76(144)120-74(47-77(145)146)92(152)126-80-55(6)166-102(162)86(60-28-38-68(143)39-29-60)132-88(148)52(3)117-90(150)73(46-63-49-116-104(112)119-63)124-106(164)134-100(160)84(61-43-69(108)87(147)70(109)44-61)128-93(153)75(50-136)123-97(157)81(56-20-30-64(139)31-21-56)127-91(151)72(45-62-48-115-103(111)118-62)122-89(149)71(18-16-41-114-105(113)163)121-94(154)78(53(4)137)125-98(158)82(57-22-32-65(140)33-23-57)130-99(159)83(58-24-34-66(141)35-25-58)129-95(155)79(54(5)138)133-107(165)135(42-15-14-40-110)101(161)85(131-96(80)156)59-26-36-67(142)37-27-59;/h9,11,13,19-39,43-44,51-55,62-63,71-75,78-86,136-143,147H,7-8,10,12,14-18,40-42,45-50,110H2,1-6H3,(H,117,150)(H,120,144)(H,121,154)(H,122,149)(H,123,157)(H,125,158)(H,126,152)(H,127,151)(H,128,153)(H,129,155)(H,130,159)(H,131,156)(H,132,148)(H,133,165)(H,145,146)(H3,111,115,118)(H3,112,116,119)(H3,113,114,163)(H2,124,134,160,164);1H2/b11-9+,19-13+; Key:NJCUSQKMYNTYOW-MWUYRYRWSA-N

Enramycin (also known as enduracidin) is a polypeptide antibiotic produced by Streptomyces fungicidus. Enramycin is widely used as a feed additive for pigs and chickens to prevent necrotic enteritis induced by Gram-positive gut pathogens.

== Mechanism of action ==
Enramycin acts as an inhibitor of the enzyme MurG, which is essential for cell wall biosynthesis in Gram-positive bacteria. MurG catalyzes the transglycosylation reaction in the last step of peptidoglycan biosynthesis. Inhibiting this step greatly compromises cell wall integrity leading to cell lysis.

== Spectrum of susceptibility ==
Enramycin has been found to be very effective against Gram-positive gut pathogens, most notably, Clostridium perfringens; a leading cause of necrotic enteritis. The following represents MIC data for a couple of veterinary pathogens.

- Clostridium perfringens: 0.05 μg/ml – 1.6 μg/ml
- Staphylococcus aureus: 0.013 μg/ml – 0.413 μg/ml

== Composition ==
Standard grade enramycin is composed of two main components called enramycin A and enramycin B. These two components are routinely used as analytical reference standards; however, their activity as individual compounds does not appear to be widely studied or characterized.
