= Broxyquinoline =

Chemical compound

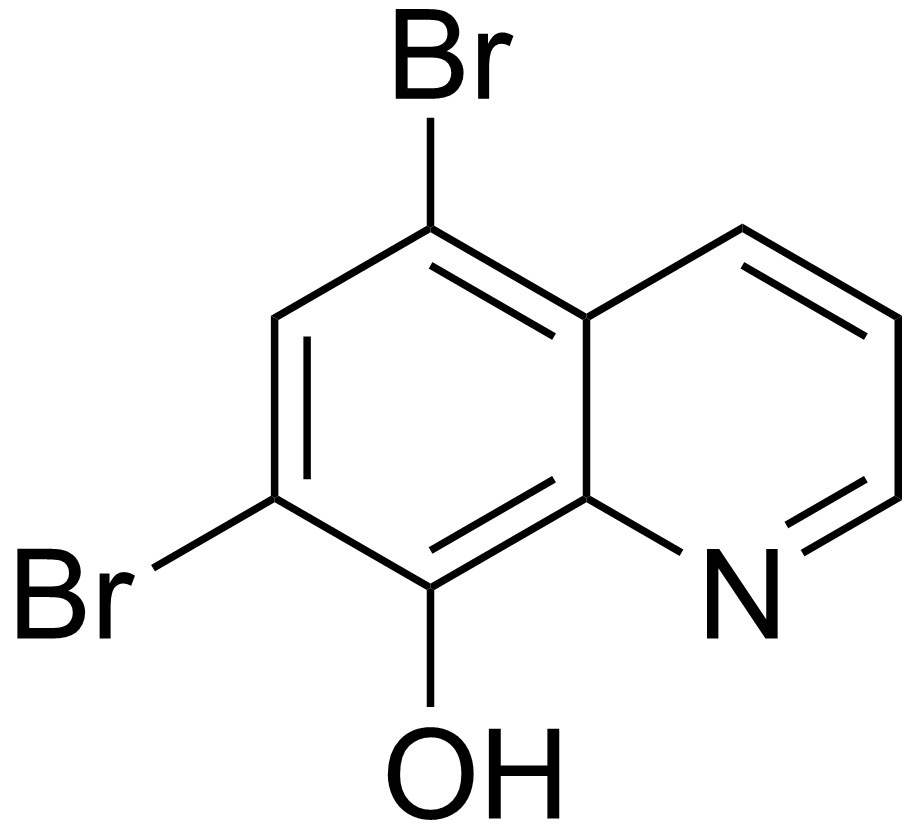

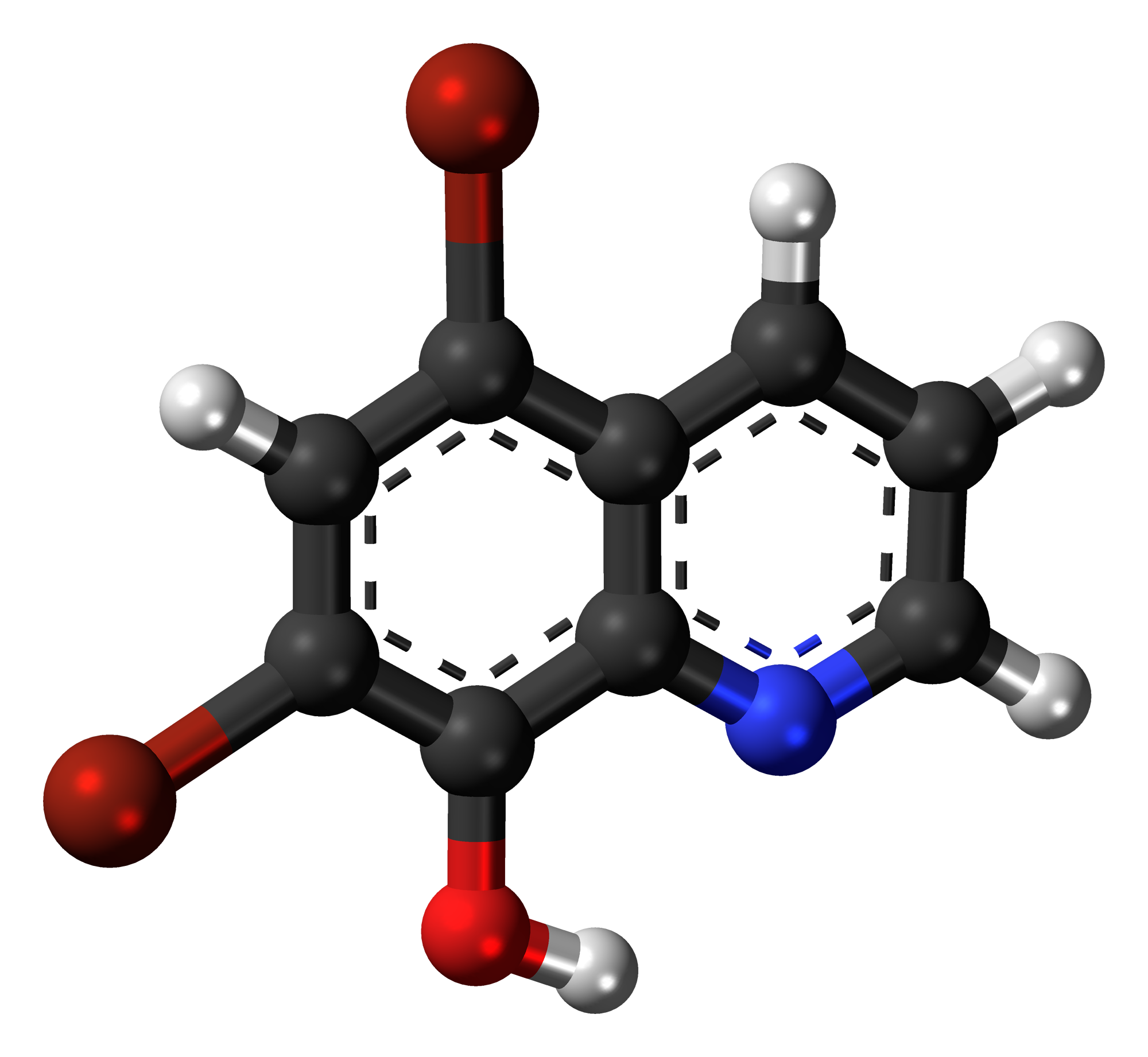

Clinical data
- AHFS/Drugs.com: International Drug Names
- ATC code: A07AX01 (WHO) G01AC06 (WHO) P01AA01 (WHO)

Identifiers
- IUPAC name: 5,7-Dibromoquinolin-8-ol
- CAS Number: 521-74-4
- PubChem CID: 2453
- DrugBank: DB13536
- ChemSpider: 2359
- UNII: UK4C618C8T
- ChEMBL: ChEMBL223448
- CompTox Dashboard (EPA): DTXSID9045849
- ECHA InfoCard: 100.007.563

Chemical and physical data
- Formula: C_{9}H_{5}Br_{2}NO
- Molar mass: 302.953 g·mol^{−1}
- 3D model (JSmol): Interactive image
- SMILES: Brc1c(O)c2ncccc2c(Br)c1
- InChI: InChI=1S/C9H5Br2NO/c10-6-4-7(11)9(13)8-5(6)2-1-3-12-8/h1-4,13H; Key:ZDASUJMDVPTNTF-UHFFFAOYSA-N

Broxyquinoline is an antiprotozoal agent.An association with exercise intolerance has been reported.
