= Albumin tannate =

Clinical data
- ATC code: A07XA01 (WHO)

Identifiers
- CAS Number: 9006-52-4
- ChemSpider: none
- ECHA InfoCard: 100.112.390

Albumin tannate (also known as Tannin albuminate) is an antidiarrheal.
