= NALF1 =

Protein-coding gene in the species Homo sapiens

Identifiers
- Aliases: NALF1, family with sequence similarity 155 member A, NLF-1, NALCN channel auxiliary factor 1, FAM155A
- External IDs: MGI: 2142765; GeneCards: NALF1

Gene location (Human)
Chr.	Chromosome 13 (human)
Band	13q33.3	Start	107,163,510 bp
Band	13q33.3	End	107,867,496 bp

Gene location (Mouse)
Chr.	Chromosome 8 (mouse)
Band	8|8 A1.1	Start	9,255,902 bp
Band	8|8 A1.1	End	9,821,161 bp
RNA expression pattern
Bgee	Human / Mouse (ortholog); Top expressed in: endothelial cell; Brodmann area 23; buccal mucosa cell; middle temporal gyrus; amniotic fluid; lateral nuclear group of thalamus; primary visual cortex; postcentral gyrus; entorhinal cortex; superior frontal gyrus / Top expressed in: subiculum; piriform cortex; dorsomedial hypothalamic nucleus; ventral tegmental area; mammillary body; ventromedial nucleus; medial dorsal nucleus; medial geniculate nucleus; suprachiasmatic nucleus; pineal gland; More reference expression data
BioGPS	n/a
Gene ontology
Molecular function	stretch-activated, cation-selective, calcium channel activity
Cellular component	membrane; integral component of membrane; plasma membrane
Biological process	calcium ion import across plasma membrane
Sources:Amigo / QuickGO
Orthologs
Databases	NCBI: entry; OMA: entry
Species	Human	Mouse
Entrez	728215	270028
Ensembl	ENSG00000204442	ENSMUSG00000079157
UniProt	B1AL88	Q8CCS2
RefSeq (mRNA)	NM_001080396	NM_173446; NM_001347127
RefSeq (protein)	NP_001073865	NP_001334056; NP_775622
Location (UCSC)	Chr 13: 107.16 – 107.87 Mb	Chr 8: 9.26 – 9.82 Mb
PubMed search
- Wikidata
View/Edit Human	View/Edit Mouse

NALCN channel auxiliary factor 1 is a protein that in humans is encoded by the NALF1 gene (previously FAM155A). The NALF1 protein is a subunit of the NALCN channelosome complex, which is a voltage-gated ion channel that regulates the resting potential of cell membranes, which controls neuronal excitability.

== See also ==
- NALF2
