= Thomas Borody =

Australian gastroenterologist (1950–2025)

Thomas J. Borody FRSN (12 January 1950 – 6 October 2025) was an Australian gastroenterologist.

In the 1980s Borody contributed to development of a treatment for Helicobacter pylori. During the COVID-19 pandemic he became embroiled in controversy for advocating an ivermectin-based purported "cure" for COVID-19 without transparently declaring his financial interest in it.

== Biography ==
Borody was born in 1950 in Kraków, Poland. His father was a Seventh-Day Adventist minister and the family immigrated to Australia when he was ten years old.

Borody completed both his BSc(Med) and later MB BS degrees at the University of New South Wales, graduating in 1974. He studied Tropical Medicine at Sydney University and later gained practical experience in the Solomon Islands in 1978 in general parasitology and the treatment of malaria, tuberculosis and leprosy before working at St Vincent's Hospital. He undertook postgraduate research at Sydney's Garvan Institute of Medical Research, culminating in his MD, then at the Mayo Clinic in Rochester, Minnesota. After further research on return to Sydney, he was awarded his PhD and then Doctorate in Science.

In 1984, Borody founded the Centre for Digestive Diseases (CDD) in Five Dock, New South Wales, a private day procedure hospital specialising in the diagnosis and treatment of diseases and disorders of the digestive system, with a focus on infective diseases and novel and alternative treatment solutions.

As of 2013, Borody was a board member of RedHill Biopharma, an Israeli pharmaceutical company. He was elected a Fellow of the Royal Society of New South Wales in 2018.

== Peptic ulcers ==
In the 1980s Borody contributed to development of a treatment for Helicobacter pylori that has now been superseded. He and his colleagues developed a "triple therapy" combining bismuth, tetracycline and flagyl.

== Fecal microbiota transplantation ==
Borody has used fecal microbiota transplantation (FMT) as a treatment for Clostridioides difficile infection. He has also promoted FMT for other conditions, including irritable bowel syndrome, Crohn's disease and ulcerative colitis, but studies have yet to prove conclusively whether the treatment is effective.

== COVID-19 ==
In 2020, Borody announced that he had discovered a "cure" for COVID-19: a combination of ivermectin, doxycycline and zinc. In a media interview Borody stated "The biggest thing about this is no one will make money from this".

It later emerged that Topelia Australia, Borody's company, had filed a patent for the drug combination. Borody was publicly accused of not adequately disclosing his conflict of interest. Wendy Lipworth from The University of Sydney's Health Ethics Centre described such behaviour as "blatantly unethical". Borody, via lawyers, denied wrongdoing.

As of 22 December 2021 the Australian Government Department of Health says there is "insufficient evidence to recommend ivermectin, doxycycline and zinc (either separately, or in combination) for the prevention or treatment of COVID-19".

== Publications ==
He authored over 300 publications and regularly presented at gastroenterology conferences. He was a reviewer for a number of medical journals, including:

- Journal of Clinical Gastroenterology
- World Journal of Gastrointestinal Pharmacology and Therapeutics (Editorial Board)
- American Journal of Gastroenterology
- Digestive Diseases and Sciences Endoscopy
- Journal of Gastroenterology and Hepatology
- Medical Journal of Australia
- Digestive and Liver Diseases

== See also ==
- Medical ethics
- Science by press conference
