= Kendal Black Drop =

Drug

Kendal Black Drop was a kind of laudanum, a drug based on opium. Named after Kendal on the edge of the Lake District, England, it is associated with the romantic poet, Samuel Taylor Coleridge.

== Description ==
Black Drop was a 19th-century dark medicine made of opium, vinegar, spices, often with sugar, sometimes called Black drops, and known in Great Britain and North America.

One recipe for Black Drop began, "Macerate the opium and nutmeg in ... the diluted acetic acid, for seven days, stirring frequently".

As well as Kendal Black Drop, there were versions called Lancaster and Armstrong's Black Drop. Other names given in a 19th-century Cyclopædia of Several Thousand Practical Receipts were Quaker's or Toustall's Black Drop, after a Dr. Toustall of the Society of Friends in County Durham who is said to have invented the recipe.

In 1823, Byron referred to it in his poem Don Juan:

for Cupid's cup
With the first draught intoxicates apace,
A quintessential laudanum or 'black drop',
Which makes one drunk at once

At first Coleridge welcomed the relief from pain provided by Kendal Black Drop, but was later to say that his "eyes had been opened to the true nature of the habit into which I had been ignorantly deluded by the seeming magic effects of opium".
