= Aminosalicylic acid =

Aminosalicylic acid can refer to any amino derivative of salicylic acid, such as:

- 3-Aminosalicylic acid
- 4-Aminosalicylic acid (para-aminosalicylic acid, PAS)
- 5-Aminosalicylic acid (mesalazine)
- 6-Aminosalicylic acid
