= Balsalazide =

Anti-inflammatory drug

Clinical data
- Trade names: Colazal, Giazo
- AHFS/Drugs.com: Monograph
- MedlinePlus: a699052
- License data: US DailyMed: by mouth
- Pregnancy category: AU: C
- Routes of administration: By mouth
- ATC code: A07EC04 (WHO)

Legal status
- Legal status: AU: S4 (Prescription only); UK: POM (Prescription only); US: ℞-only

Pharmacokinetic data
- Bioavailability: <1%
- Protein binding: ≥99%
- Elimination half-life: 12hr

Identifiers
- IUPAC name: (E)-5-{[4-(2-carboxyethylcarbamoyl)phenyl]diazenyl}-2-hydroxybenzoic acid
- CAS Number: 80573-04-2
- PubChem CID: 5362070
- DrugBank: DB01014
- ChemSpider: 10662422
- UNII: P80AL8J7ZP
- KEGG: D07488; as salt: D02715
- ChEBI: CHEBI:267413
- ChEMBL: ChEMBL1201346
- CompTox Dashboard (EPA): DTXSID7040653
- ECHA InfoCard: 100.117.186

Chemical and physical data
- Formula: C_{17}H_{15}N_{3}O_{6}
- Molar mass: 357.322 g·mol^{−1}
- 3D model (JSmol): Interactive image
- SMILES: O=C(O)c1cc(ccc1O)/N=N/c2ccc(cc2)C(=O)NCCC(O)=O
- InChI: InChI=1S/C17H15N3O6/c21-14-6-5-12(9-13(14)17(25)26)20-19-11-3-1-10(2-4-11)16(24)18-8-7-15(22)23/h1-6,9,21H,7-8H2,(H,18,24)(H,22,23)(H,25,26)/b20-19+; Key:IPOKCKJONYRRHP-FMQUCBEESA-N

Balsalazide is an anti-inflammatory drug used in the treatment of inflammatory bowel disease. It is sold under the brand names Giazo, Colazal in the US and Colazide in the UK. It is also sold in generic form in the US by several generic manufacturers.

It is usually administered as the disodium salt. Balsalazide is a prodrug of mesalazine, also known as 5-aminosalicylic acid, or 5-ASA. The advantage of balsalazide over mesalazine in the treatment of ulcerative colitis is believed to be due to balsalazide not being metabolized in the small intestine; it can thus reach the large intestine intact, where it is then metabolized to mesalazine. It is in the category of disease-modifying antirheumatic drugs (DMARDs) family of medications. It is unclear exactly how it works.

== Synthesis ==
Ex 3 is actually for Ipsalazide. See Ex 4 for Balsalazide proper. Same protocol but uses β-Alanine.

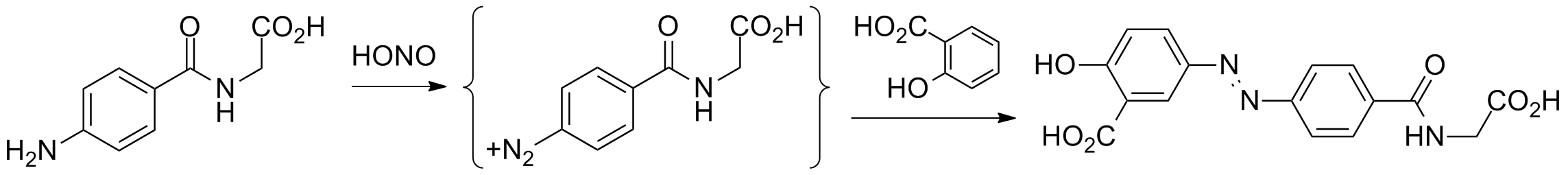
Balsalazide synthesis: Biorex Laboratories, GB 2080796 (1986).

1. Starting material is 4-aminohippuric acid, obtained by coupling para-aminobenzoic acid and glycine.
2. That product is then treated with nitrous acid to give the diazonium salt.
3. Reaction of this species with salicylic acid proceeds at the position para to the phenol to give balsalazide.
