= Antipropulsive =

Antidiarrhoeal drug

An antipropulsive is a drug used in the treatment of diarrhea. It does not address the underlying cause (for example, infection or malabsorption), but it does decrease motility.

Examples include diphenoxylate, loperamide, and eluxadoline.

== See also ==
- Propulsive
