= Olsalazine =

Pharmaceutical drug used for ulcerative colitis

Clinical data
- Trade names: Dipentum
- AHFS/Drugs.com: Monograph
- MedlinePlus: a601088
- License data: US DailyMed: Olsalazine
- Pregnancy category: AU: C
- Routes of administration: By mouth
- ATC code: A07EC03 (WHO)

Legal status
- Legal status: AU: S4 (Prescription only); UK: POM (Prescription only); US: ℞-only

Pharmacokinetic data
- Protein binding: 99%
- Elimination half-life: 0.9 hours

Identifiers
- IUPAC name: 5,5'-diazenediyldi(2-hydroxybenzoic acid)
- CAS Number: 15722-48-2
- PubChem CID: 22419
- DrugBank: DB01250
- ChemSpider: 10642377
- UNII: ULS5I8J03O
- KEGG: D08295; as salt: D00727
- ChEMBL: ChEMBL425
- CompTox Dashboard (EPA): DTXSID8023391
- ECHA InfoCard: 100.116.494

Chemical and physical data
- Formula: C_{14}H_{10}N_{2}O_{6}
- Molar mass: 302.242 g·mol^{−1}
- 3D model (JSmol): Interactive image
- SMILES: O=C(O)c1cc(ccc1O)/N=N/c2cc(C(O)=O)c(O)cc2
- InChI: InChI=1S/C14H10N2O6/c17-11-3-1-7(5-9(11)13(19)20)15-16-8-2-4-12(18)10(6-8)14(21)22/h1-6,17-18H,(H,19,20)(H,21,22)/b16-15+; Key:QQBDLJCYGRGAKP-FOCLMDBBSA-N

Olsalazine is an anti-inflammatory medication used in the treatment of ulcerative colitis. It is sold under the brand name Dipentum.

Olsalazine itself is a prodrug of mesalazine (5-aminosalicyclic acid or 5-ASA) and is not absorbed in the small intestine. Instead it continues through to the colon where it is cleaved into two molecules of 5-ASA by azoreductases produced by colonic bacteria. Olsalazine thus exerts its anti-inflammatory effect by its colonic breakdown into 5-ASA which inhibits cyclooxygenase and lipoxygenase thereby reducing prostaglandin and leukotriene production.

== History ==
Olsalazine gained Food and Drug Administration (FDA) approval in 1990.

== Supply ==
The drug is supplied by UCB Pharma.

== Research ==
In 2006 the Australian biotech company Giaconda received a European patent for a combination therapy for treating constipation-predominant irritable bowel syndrome that uses olsalazine and the anti-gout drug colchicine, for trials the following year.
