= Guaiac (disambiguation) =

Guaiac can refer to:

- Guaiacum, a genus of shrubs and trees native to the Americas
- Oil of guaiac, a fragrance used in soap
- Guaiacol, a natural organic compound derived from Guaiacum
- Stool guaiac test, a test for the presence for occult blood
