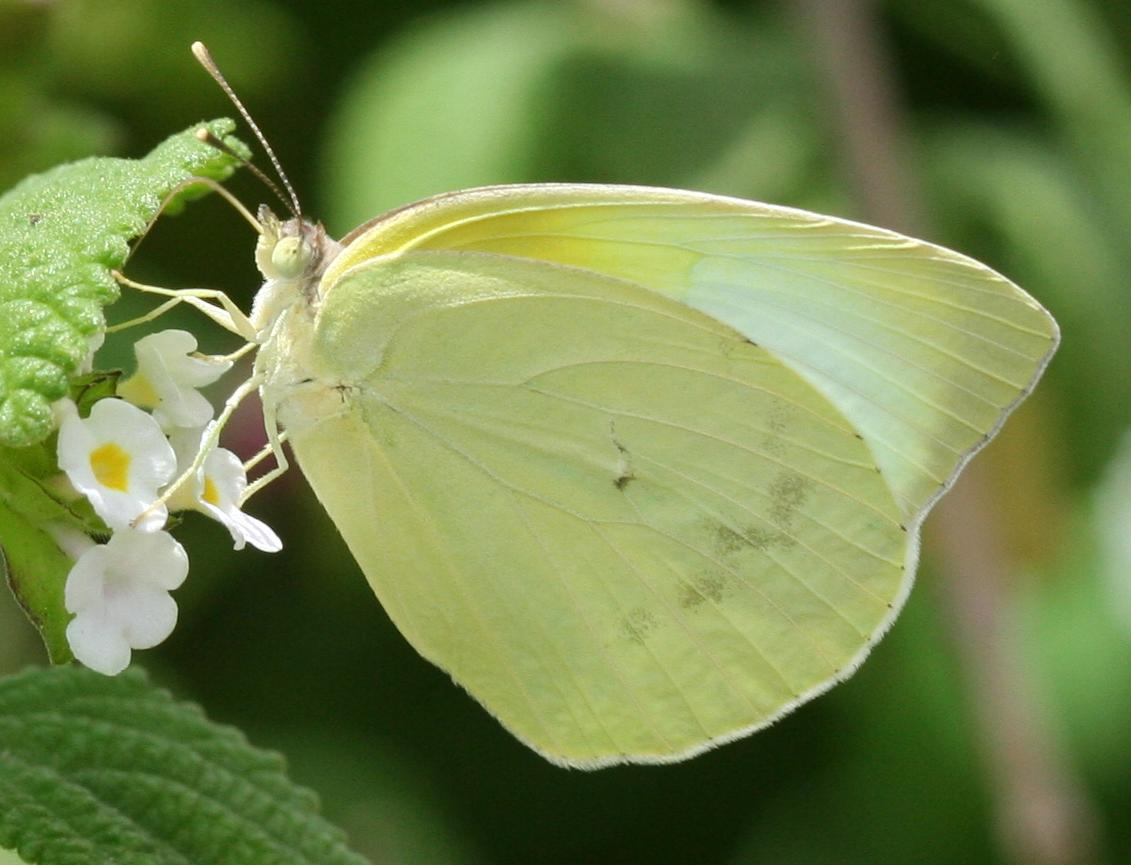

Conservation status
- Secure (NatureServe)

Scientific classification
- Kingdom: Animalia
- Phylum: Arthropoda
- Clade: Pancrustacea
- Class: Insecta
- Order: Lepidoptera
- Family: Pieridae
- Genus: Kricogonia
- Species: K. lyside

Binomial name
- Kricogonia lyside (Godart, 1819)

= Kricogonia lyside =

Species of butterfly

Kricogonia lyside, the lyside sulphur or guayacan sulphur, is a North American, Caribbean, and South American butterfly in the family Pieridae.

In seasons with heavy monsoons, this butterfly is seen in massive migrations which are frequent in Texas but more rare in the southwest. It is also an occasional resident in southern Florida.

== Description ==
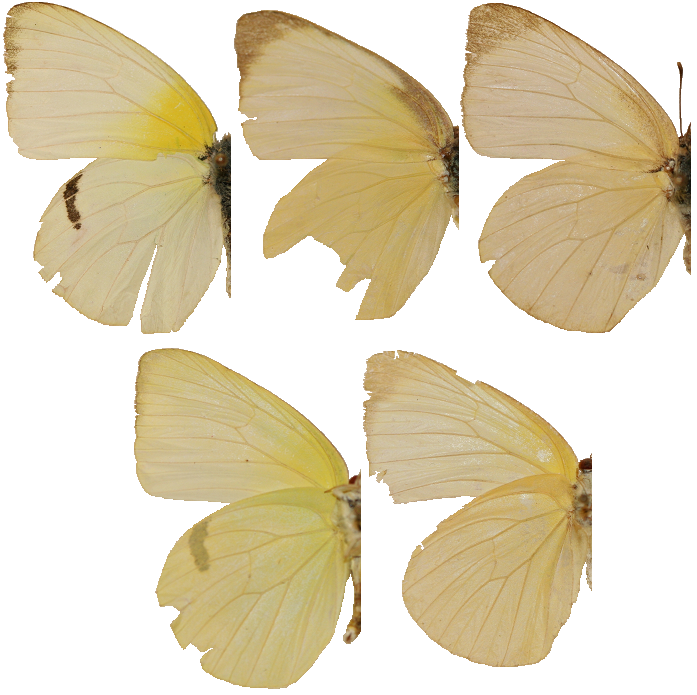
Lyside sulphur variation. The top row shows the upperside of the wings and the bottom row shows the underside of the wings.

The lyside sulphur is variable. The upperside of the wings is pale yellow, usually with a black bar on the leading edge of the hindwing and a bright yellow patch near the base of the forewing. Some individuals also have black borders along the costa and apex of the forewing. The underside of the wings varies from a greenish color to bright yellow to almost white. Greener individuals have a whitish vein in the center of the hindwing and a bright yellow forewing basal patch. It has a wingspan of 3.8 to 6 cm (1.5 to 2.4 in).

== Similar species ==
Similar species in the lyside sulphur's range include Queen Alexandra's sulphur (Colias alexandra), the cloudless sulphur (Phoebis sennae), and the statira sulphur (Aphrissa statira).

Queen Alexandra's sulphur has more yellow on the underside of the forewing and has a whitish spot in the center of the hindwing.

The cloudless sulphur is larger and is much more yellow.

The statira sulphur has a more yellowish upper side and the underside of the wings is pale greenish to white with females having light pinkish markings.

== Habitat ==
The lyside sulphur may be found in open, subtropical scrub.

== Flight ==
This butterfly is seen almost all year in southern Texas and is seen from early July to mid-November in Arizona. In Florida there have been scattered sightings from July to October.

== Life cycle ==
The larva is highly variable. It ranges in color from grass green to blackish green. It may have markings or may be unmarked. Marked individuals usually have dorsal and spiracular silvery stripes. It is the only caterpillar to feed on plants in the family Zygophyllaceae. Apparently they feed exclusively on the leaves of three Guaiacum species: G. sanctum and G. angustifolium in Central and North America and G. officinale in South America and the Caribbean. The chrysalis is a bluish-green color. The lyside sulphur can grow from egg to adult in as little as 13 days. It has three or more broods per year in southern Texas.
