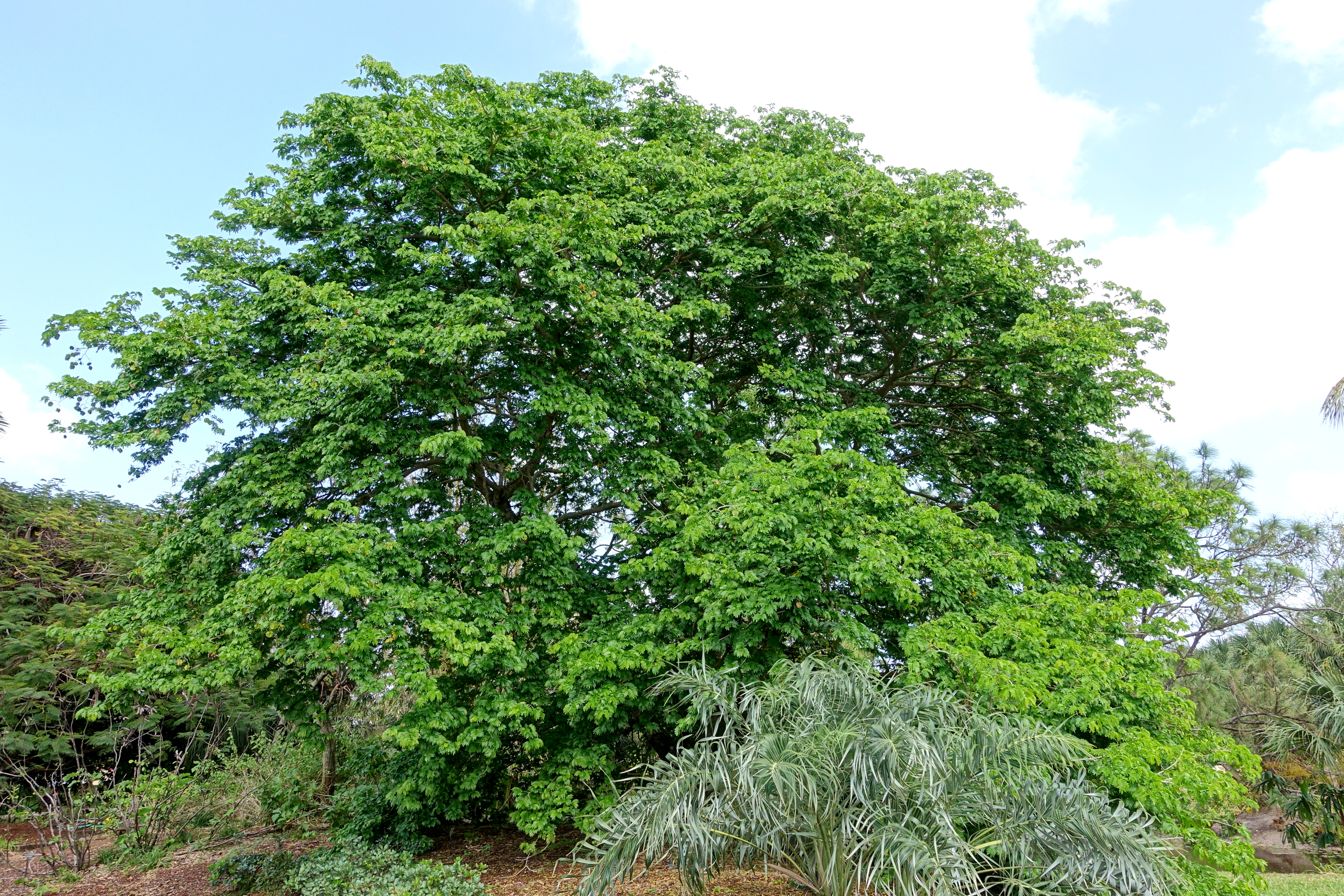

Scientific classification
- Kingdom: Plantae
- Clade: Tracheophytes
- Clade: Angiosperms
- Clade: Eudicots
- Clade: Rosids
- Order: Zygophyllales
- Family: Zygophyllaceae
- Genus: Bulnesia
- Species: B. arborea

Binomial name
- Bulnesia arborea (Jacq.) Engl.

Synonyms
- Zygophyllum arboreum Jacq.

= Bulnesia arborea =

Species of flowering plant

Bulnesia arborea is a species of flowering plant in the creosote subfamily (Larreoideae) of family Zygophyllaceae. It is native to Colombia and Venezuela. Related to the true lignum vitae trees (Guaiacum), it is known as Maracaibo lignum vitae or (like its relative B. sarmientoi) as "verawood".

== Gallery ==
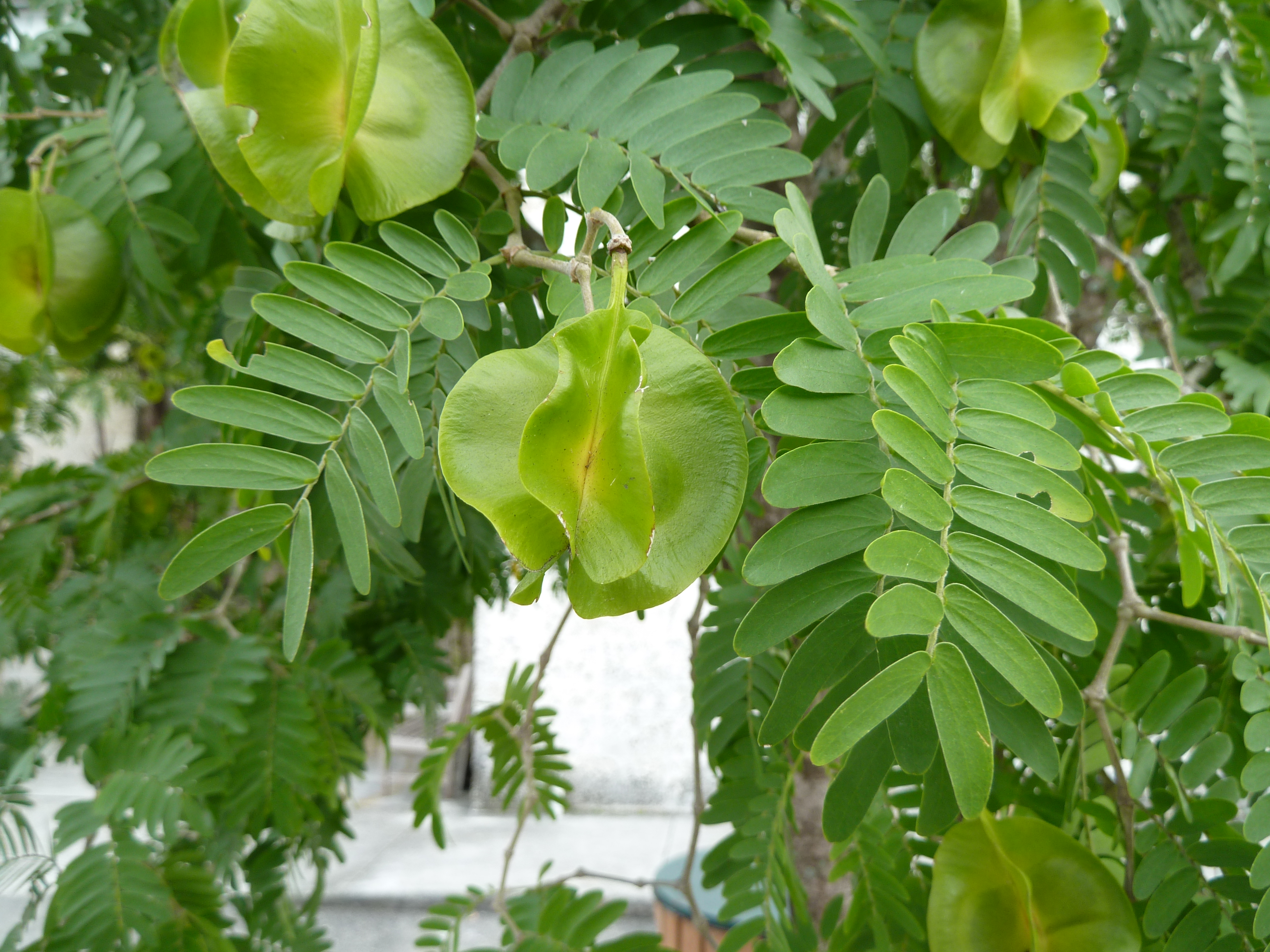
Fruits

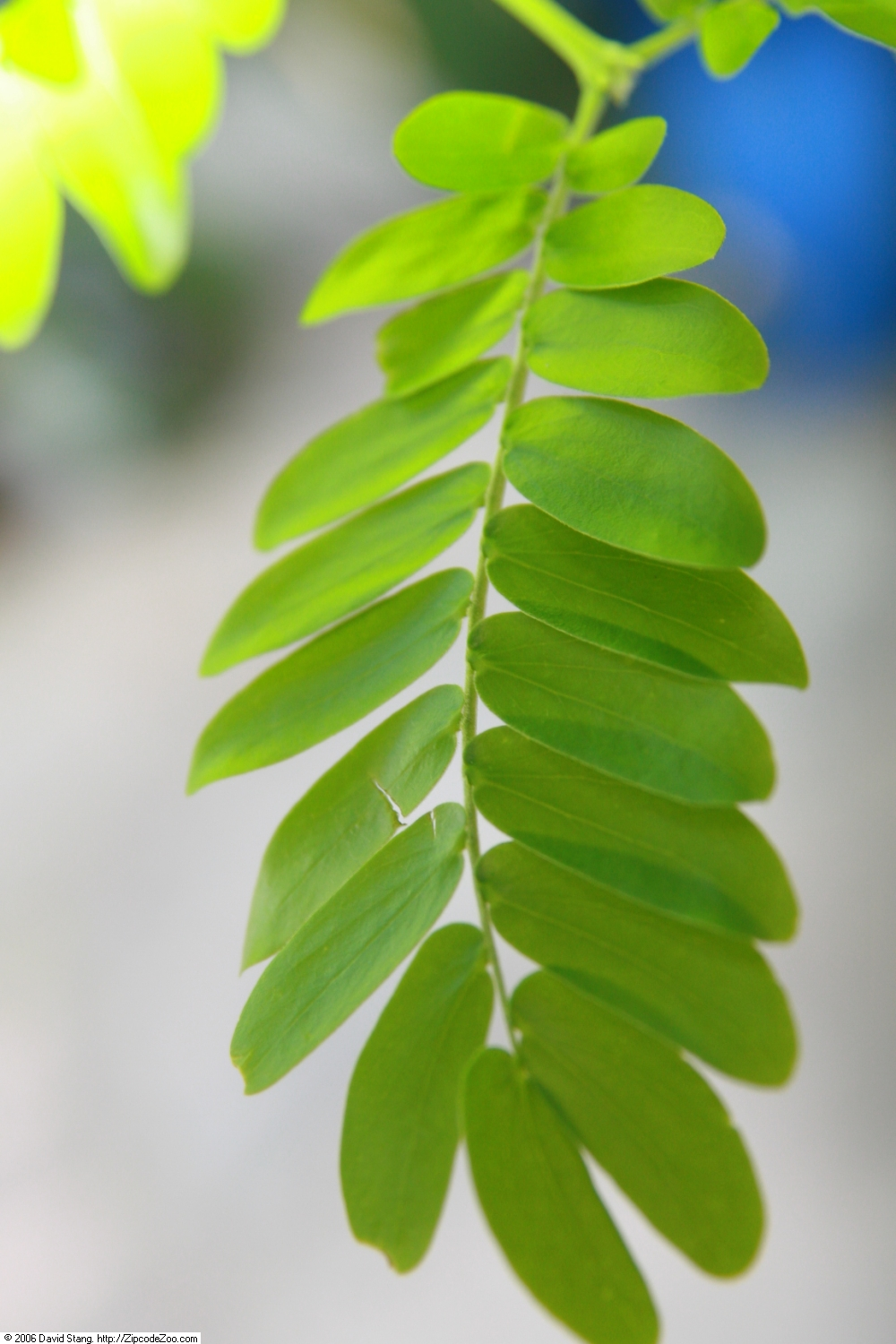
Leaf

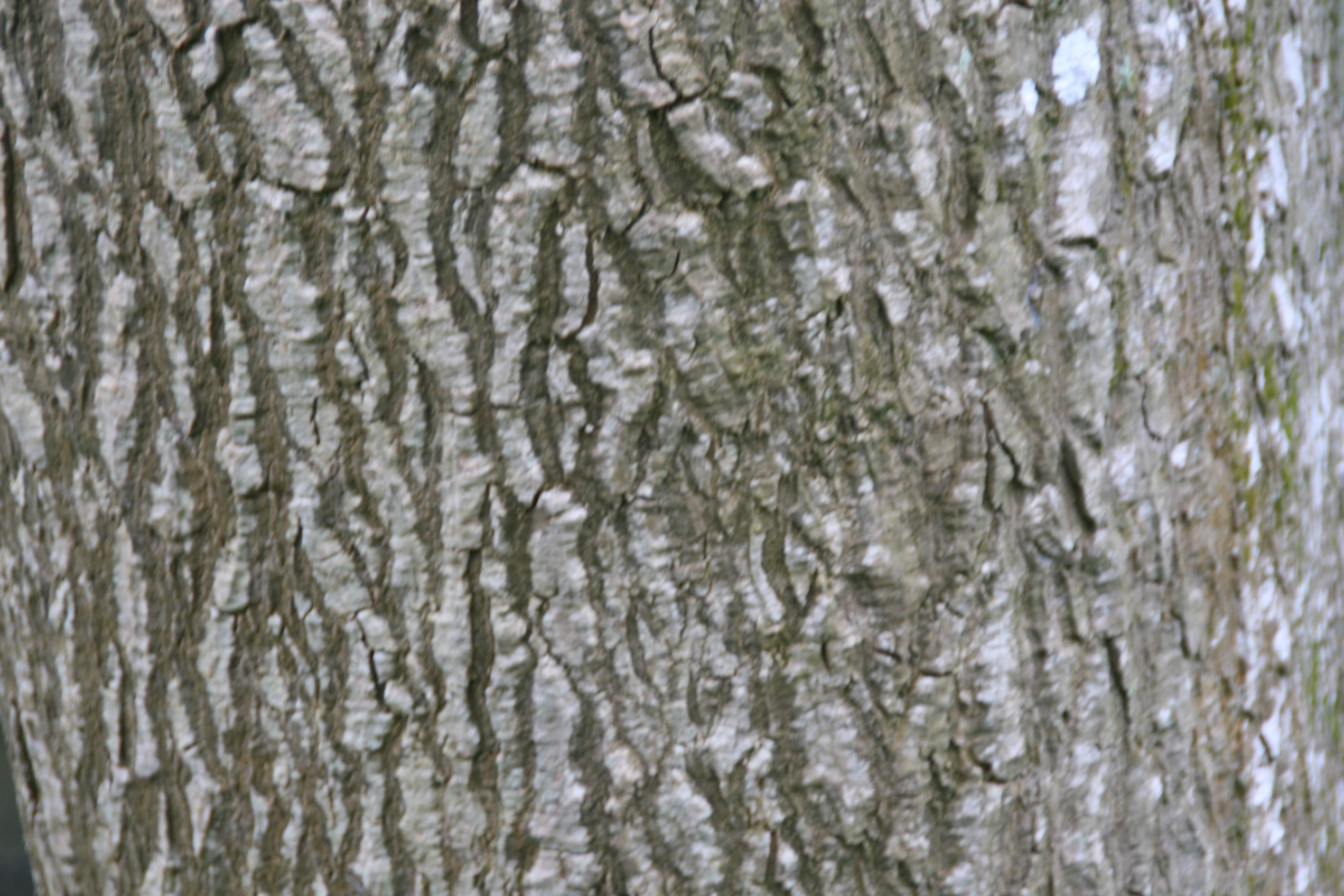
Bark

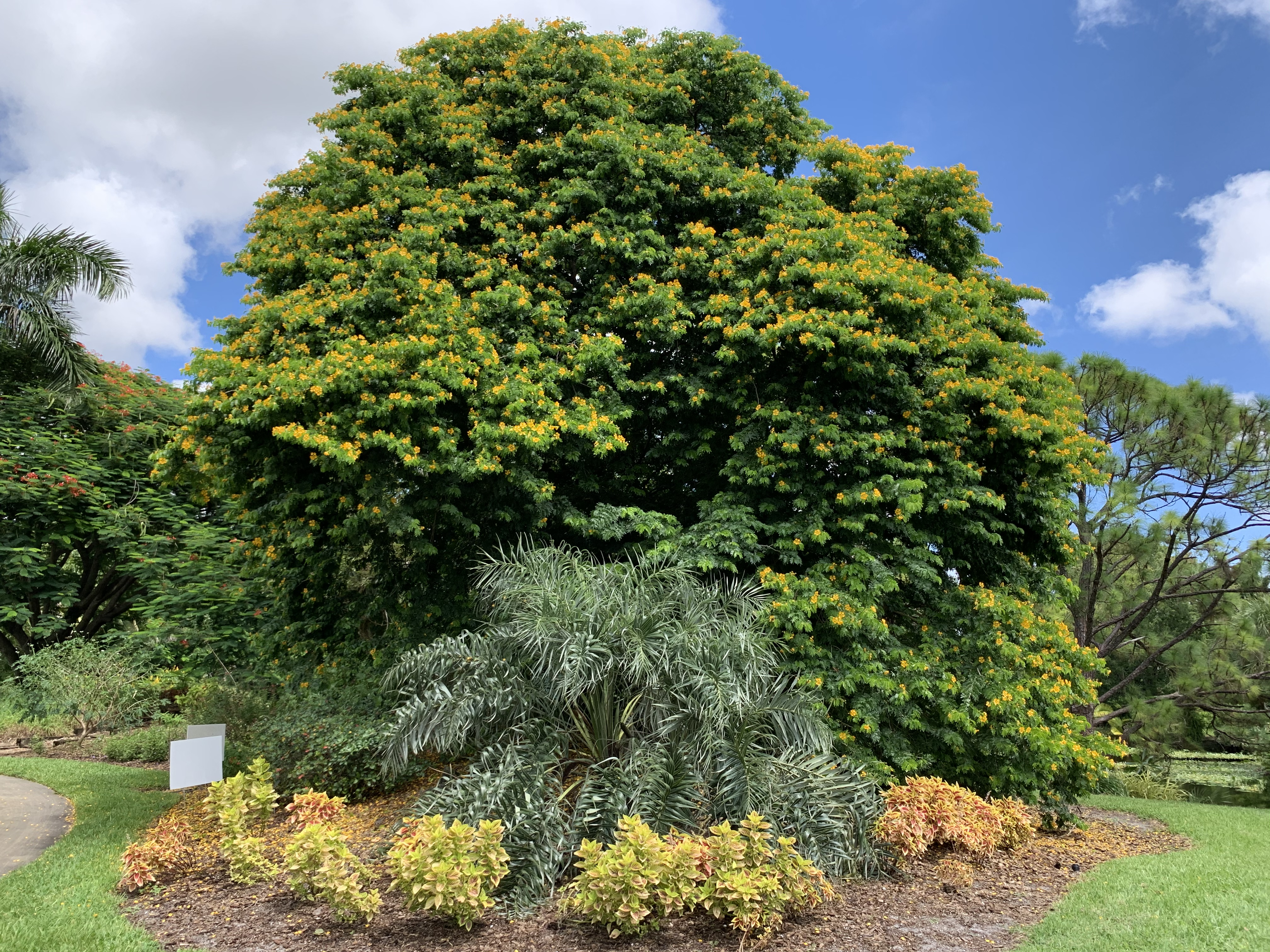
Gonopterodendron arboreum in bloom in Mounts Botanical Garden

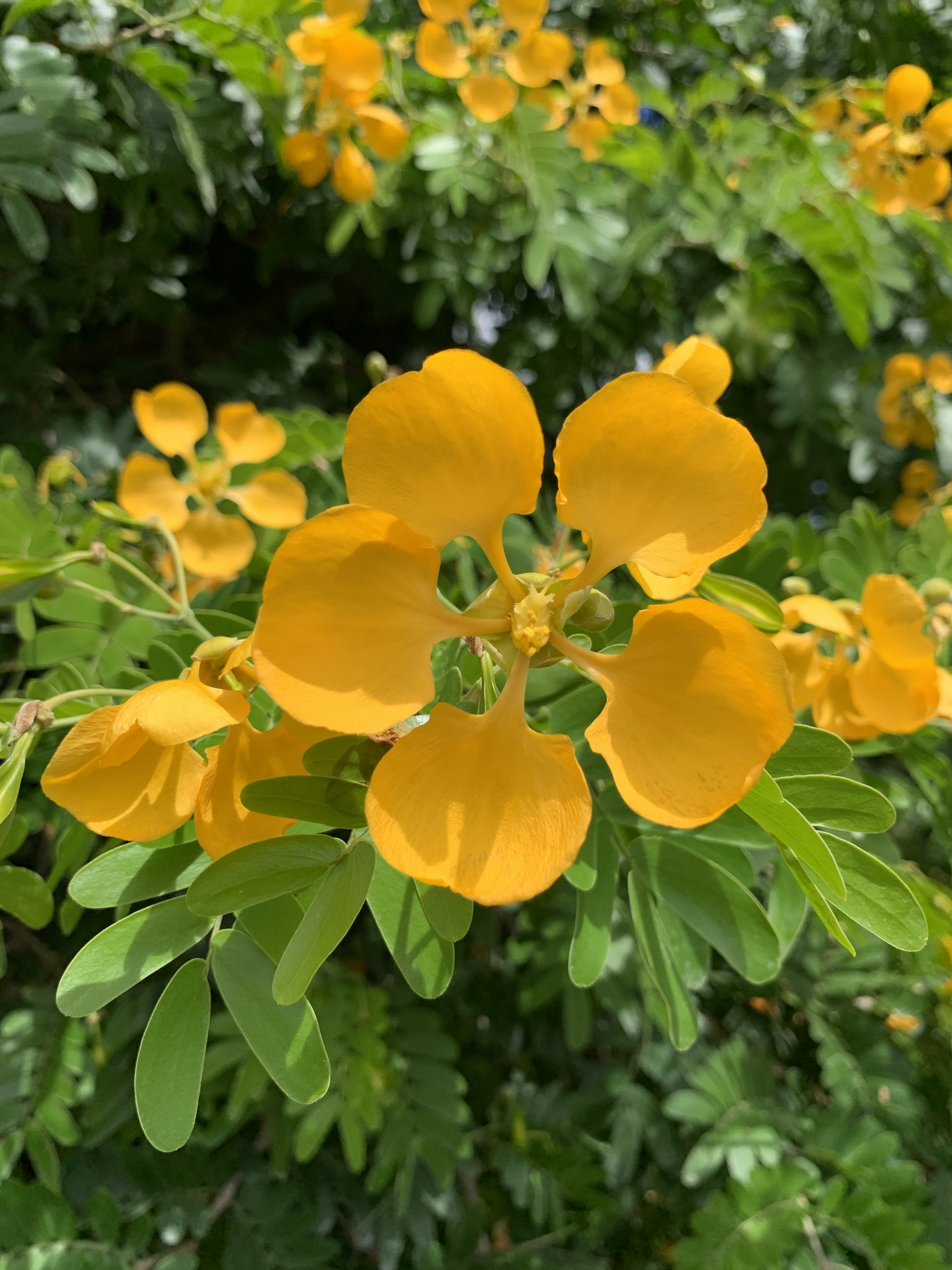
Gonopterodendron arboreum in bloom in Mounts Botanical Garden

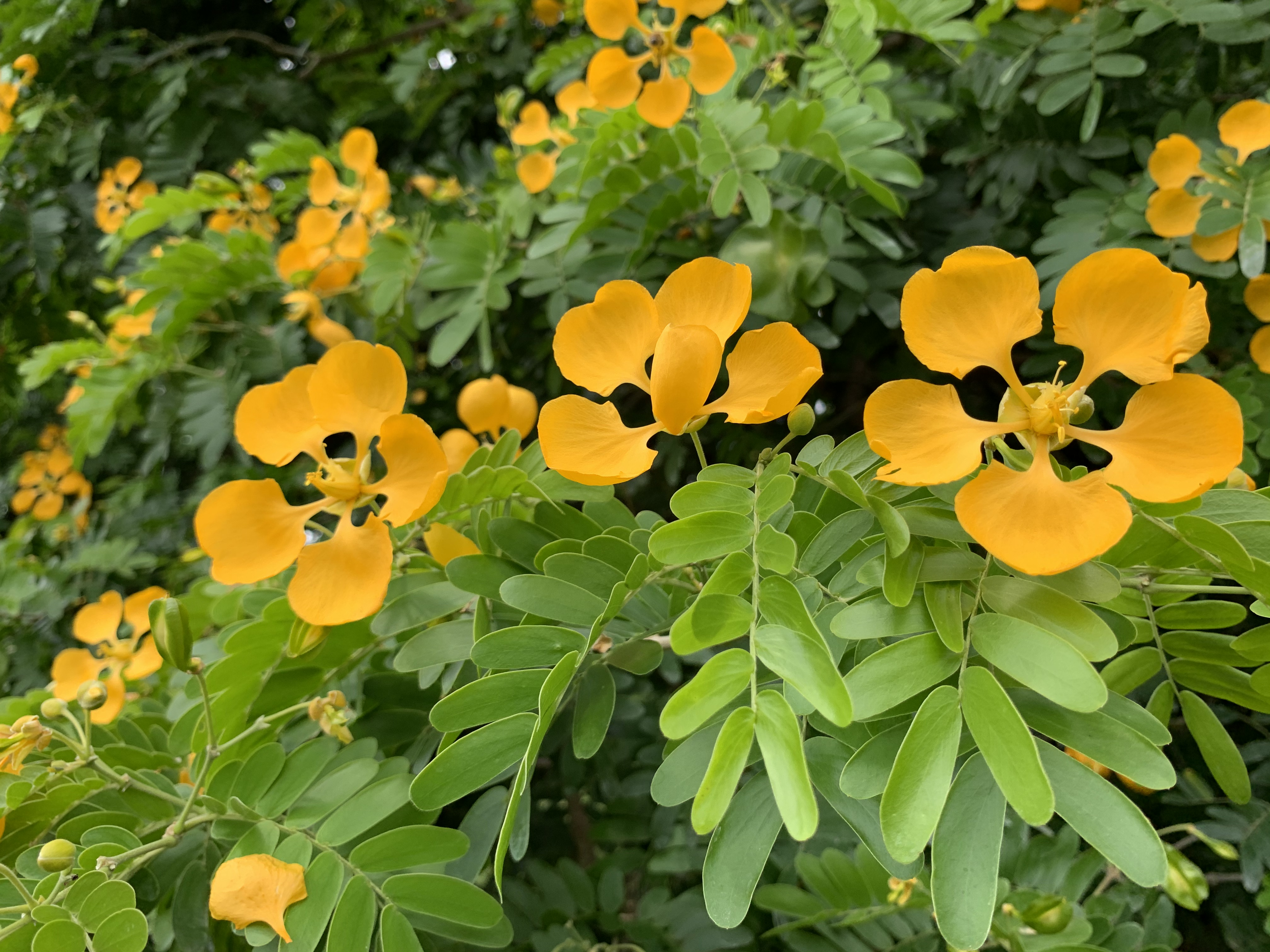
Gonopterodendron arboreum in bloom in Mounts Botanical Garden

Media related to Bulnesia arborea at Wikimedia Commons
