= Guaiene =

Guaienes
α-Guaiene
β-Guaiene
- δ-Guaiene

Names
- IUPAC names α: (1S,4S,7R)-1,4-Dimethyl-7-(prop-1-en-2-yl)-1,2,3,4,5,6,7,8-octahydroazulene β: (1S,4S)-1,4-Dimethyl-7-(propan-2-ylidene)-1,2,3,4,5,6,7,8-octahydroazulene δ: (3S,3aS,5R)-3,8-Dimethyl-5-(prop-1-en-2-yl)-1,2,3,3a,4,5,6,7-octahydroazulene
- Other names Guajene

Identifiers
CAS Number	3691-12-1 (α); 88-84-6 (β); 3691-11-0 (δ)
3D model (JSmol)	(α): Interactive image; (β): Interactive image; (δ): Interactive image
ChemSpider	4476575 (α); 16736689 (β); 85080 (δ)
PubChem CID	5317844 (α); 15560252 (β); 94275 (δ)
UNII	ABQ2CB7VAC (α); 1D018Q907T (β); 2U8L6FYE8U (δ)
- InChI: (α): InChI=1S/C15H24/c1-10(2)13-7-5-11(3)14-8-6-12(4)15(14)9-13/h11-13H,1,5-9H2,2-4H3/t11-,12-,13+/m0/s1 Key: ADIDQIZBYUABQK-RWMBFGLXSA-N; (β): InChI=1S/C15H24/c1-10(2)13-7-5-11(3)14-8-6-12(4)15(14)9-13/h11-12H,5-9H2,1-4H3/t11-,12-/m0/s1 Key: GIBQERSGRNPMEH-RYUDHWBXSA-N; (δ): InChI=1S/C15H24/c1-10(2)13-7-5-11(3)14-8-6-12(4)15(14)9-13/h12-13,15H,1,5-9H2,2-4H3/t12-,13+,15-/m0/s1 Key: YHAJBLWYOIUHHM-GUTXKFCHSA-N
- SMILES: (α): C[C@H]1CCC2=C1C[C@H](C(C)=C)CC[C@@H]2C; (β): C[C@H]1CCC2=C1C/C(CC[C@@H]2C)=C(C)\C; (δ): C[C@H]1CCC2=C(C)CC[C@@H](C(C)=C)C[C@]21[H]

Properties
Chemical formula	C_{15}H_{24}
Molar mass	204.357 g·mol^{−1}
Boiling point	α: 281-282 °C α: 78-79 °C (@ 2.5 Torr) β: 281 °C
- Except where otherwise noted, data are given for materials in their standard state (at 25 °C [77 °F], 100 kPa). verify (what is ?) Infobox references

Guaienes are a series of closely related natural chemical compounds that have been isolated from a variety of plant sources. The guaienes are sesquiterpenes with the molecular formula C_{15}H_{24}. α-Guaiene is the most common and was first isolated from guaiac wood oil from Bulnesia sarmientoi. The guaienes are used in the fragrance and flavoring industries to impart earthy, spicy aromas and tastes.

== See also ==
- Guaiol
