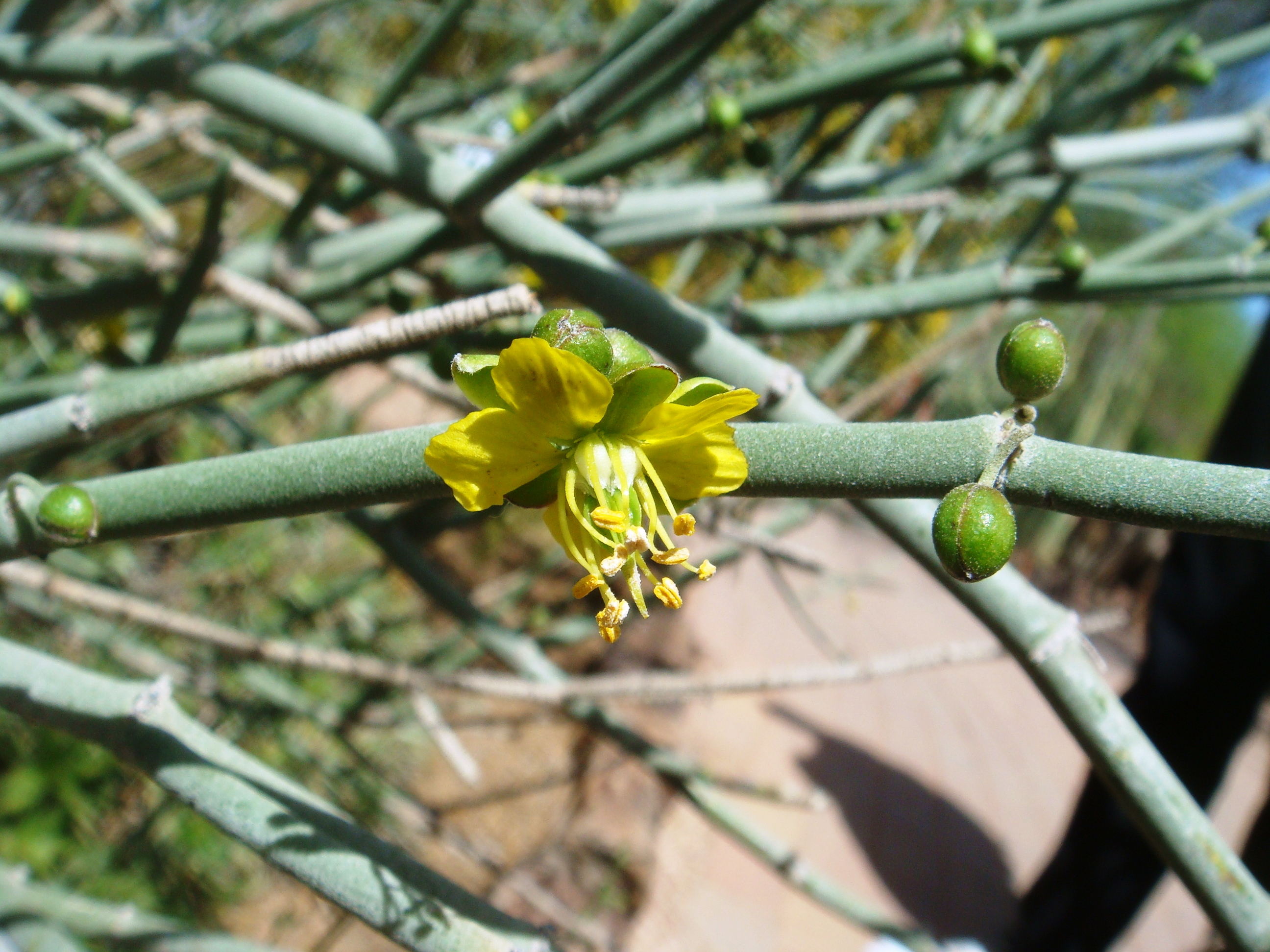
- Flowering branches of B. retama

Scientific classification
- Kingdom: Plantae
- Clade: Tracheophytes
- Clade: Angiosperms
- Clade: Eudicots
- Clade: Rosids
- Order: Zygophyllales
- Family: Zygophyllaceae
- Subfamily: Larreoideae
- Genus: Bulnesia; Gay

Species
- See text

= Bulnesia =

Genus of flowering plants

Bulnesia is a genus of flowering plants in the caltrop family, Zygophyllaceae. Species in this genus are all native to South America. The wood of some – particularly B. arborea and B. sarmientoi – is traded as verawood (colloquially "vera") or "lignum vitae". They are close relatives of the "true" lignum vitae trees of genus Guaiacum.

== Species ==
- Bulnesia arborea – Maracaibo lignum vitae; 'True' Verawood
- Bulnesia bonariensis Griseb.
- Bulnesia carrapo Killip & Dugand
- Bulnesia chilensis Gay
- Bulnesia foliosa Griseb.
- Bulnesia loraniensis Griseb.
- Bulnesia macrocarpa Phil.
- Bulnesia rivas-martinezii G.Navarro
- Bulnesia retama (Gillies ex Hook. & Arn.) Griseb
- Bulnesia sarmientoi – Argentine lignum vitae, Paraguay lignum vitae, "palo santo", ibiocaí
- Bulnesia schickendantzii Hieron.
