= Guaiol =

Names
- IUPAC name Guai-1(5)-en-11-ol
- Systematic IUPAC name 2-[(3S,5R,8S)-3,8-Dimethyl-1,2,3,4,5,6,7,8-octahydroazulen-5-yl]propan-2-ol
- Other names Champacol, 5-Azulenemethanol

Identifiers
CAS Number	489-86-1
3D model (JSmol)	Interactive image
ChEBI	CHEBI:5552
ChEMBL	ChEMBL226915
ChemSpider	198233
ECHA InfoCard	100.007.003
PubChem CID	227829
UNII	I7WP008A91
CompTox Dashboard (EPA)	DTXSID40883399
- InChI: InChI=1S/C15H26O/c1-10-5-7-12(15(3,4)16)9-14-11(2)6-8-13(10)14/h10-12,16H,5-9H2,1-4H3/t10-,11-,12+/m0/s1 Key: TWVJWDMOZJXUID-SDDRHHMPSA-N; InChI=1/C15H26O/c1-10-5-7-12(15(3,4)16)9-14-11(2)6-8-13(10)14/h10-12,16H,5-9H2,1-4H3/t10-,11-,12+/m0/s1 Key: TWVJWDMOZJXUID-SDDRHHMPBW
- SMILES: OC([C@H]1C\C2=C(/[C@H](CC1)C)CC[C@@H]2C)(C)C

Properties
Chemical formula	C_{15}H_{26}O
Molar mass	222.372 g·mol^{−1}
Density	0.961 g/mL
Melting point	92 °C (198 °F; 365 K)
- Except where otherwise noted, data are given for materials in their standard state (at 25 °C [77 °F], 100 kPa). verify (what is ?) Infobox references

Guaiol or champacol is an organic compound, a sesquiterpenoid alcohol found in several plants, especially in the oil of guaiacum and cypress pine. It is a crystalline solid that melts at 92 °C. Guaiol is one of many terpenes found in Cannabis flowers and it has been associated with a decrease in anxiolytic activity.

== Reactions ==
Guaiol yields a deep purple color when treated with electrophilic bromine reagents.

== See also ==
- Guaiene
- Guaiazulene
