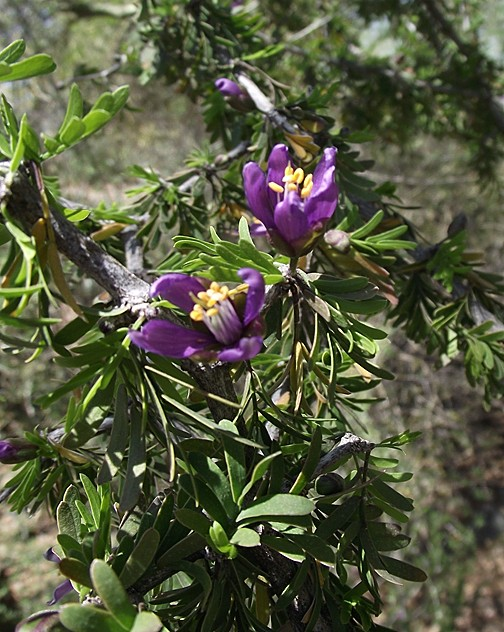

Conservation status
- Least Concern (IUCN 3.1)

- Secure (NatureServe)

Scientific classification
- Kingdom: Plantae
- Clade: Tracheophytes
- Clade: Angiosperms
- Clade: Eudicots
- Clade: Rosids
- Order: Zygophyllales
- Family: Zygophyllaceae
- Genus: Guaiacum
- Species: G. angustifolium

Binomial name
- Guaiacum angustifolium Engelm.
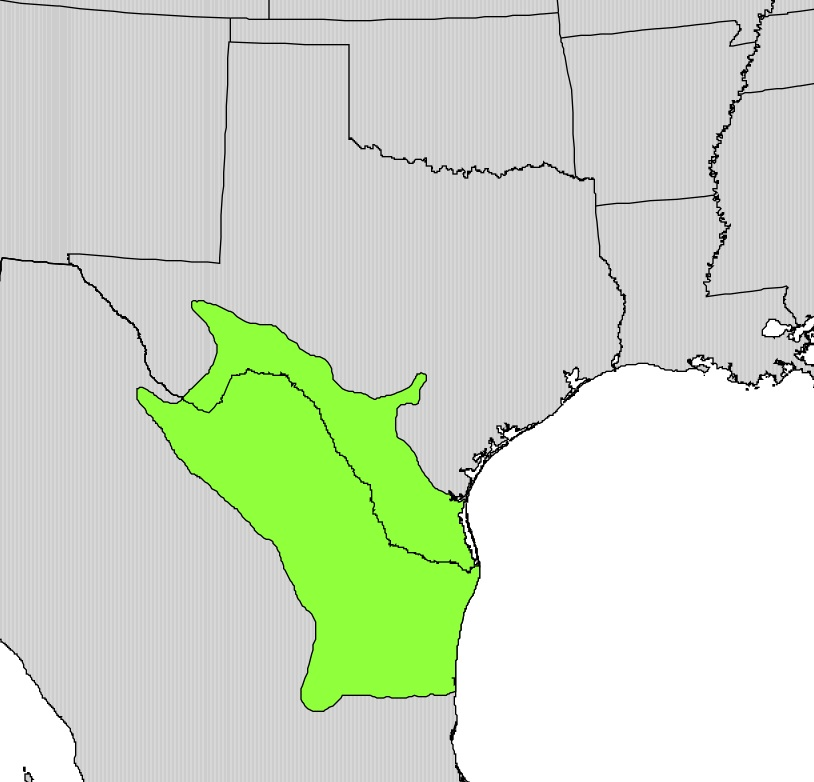
- Natural range

Synonyms
- Porlieria angustifolia (Engelm.) A.Gray

= Guaiacum angustifolium =

Species of tree

Guaiacum angustifolium is a species of flowering plant in the caltrop family, Zygophyllaceae. Common names include Texas guaiacum, Texas lignum-vitae, soapbush and huayacán. It is native to southern and western Texas in the United States and northern Mexico. The specific name is derived from the Latin angustus, meaning "narrow," and -folius, meaning "-leaved".

== Distribution ==
In Texas, this tree can be found in the area around the Rio Grande, including Austin, Matagorda Bay, New Braunfels, San Antonio, Brownsville and Fort McIntosh westward to the Rio Pecos. In the 19th century, trees growing along the outskirts of this region were so small they were described by the United States Department of Interior as "low shrub(s)". The largest examples could be found on the hillsides near the Guadalupe River valley. In Mexico, the plant is found in the states of Chihuahua, San Luis Potosí, Coahuila, Nuevo León, and Tamaulipas.

== Description ==
Texas lignum-vitae is a many branched shrub or small tree, reaching a height of 7 m (23 ft). This evergreen has a dense canopy and short lateral branches.

=== Leaves ===
Leaves are 1–3 cm (0.39–1.18 in) long, opposite and pinnately compound, with four to eight pairs of leaflets. The dark green, leathery, linear to linear-spatulate leaflets are 5–16 mm (0.20–0.63 in) long and 2–3 mm (0.079–0.118 in) wide. Leaflets fold themselves at night and when exposed to hot sunlight.

=== Flowers ===
The small blue to purple flowers are 12–22 mm (0.47–0.87 in) in diameter. They have five sepals, five petals around 1 cm (0.39 in) in length, and ten stamens. The blooming period lasts from March until September, with flowers appearing after rain.

=== Fruit ===
The fruit is a flat, leathery capsule 1–2 cm (0.39–0.79 in) in diameter with one to two lobes, sometimes as many as four. Dehiscent locules contain a single shiny, bean-like seed that is usually bright red.

== Uses ==
Like other species in its genus, the wood of G. angustifolium has extreme hardness and density and will sink in water. The sapwood is creamy yellow, while the heartwood is dark purple-brown. The wood is used for fence posts, tool handles, and firewood. Root extracts are used to treat rheumatism and sexually transmitted diseases. Soap can be made from the root bark, as it contains saponin; historically soap made in this way would be used to wash wool, since it does not fade the dyed-colors. The bark of the roots is also used as a disinfectant. The flowers are valued by beekeepers for their consistent nectar production. Texas lignum-vitae is cultivated as an ornamental because of its drought tolerance, dense foliage, compact size, gnarled branches, and fragrant flowers. It is used in hedges, rock gardens, and xeriscaping.

== Ecology ==
Guaiacum angustifolium is a host plant for the caterpillars of the lyside sulphur (Kricogonia lyside). The leaves contain 16-18% crude protein and are browsed by white-tailed deer (Odocoileus virginianus).

== Conservation ==
Like other members of its genus, the international trade of Texas lignum-vitae is restricted by CITES Appendix II. Only seeds, pollen, and finished products ready for retail sale may be legally exported.
