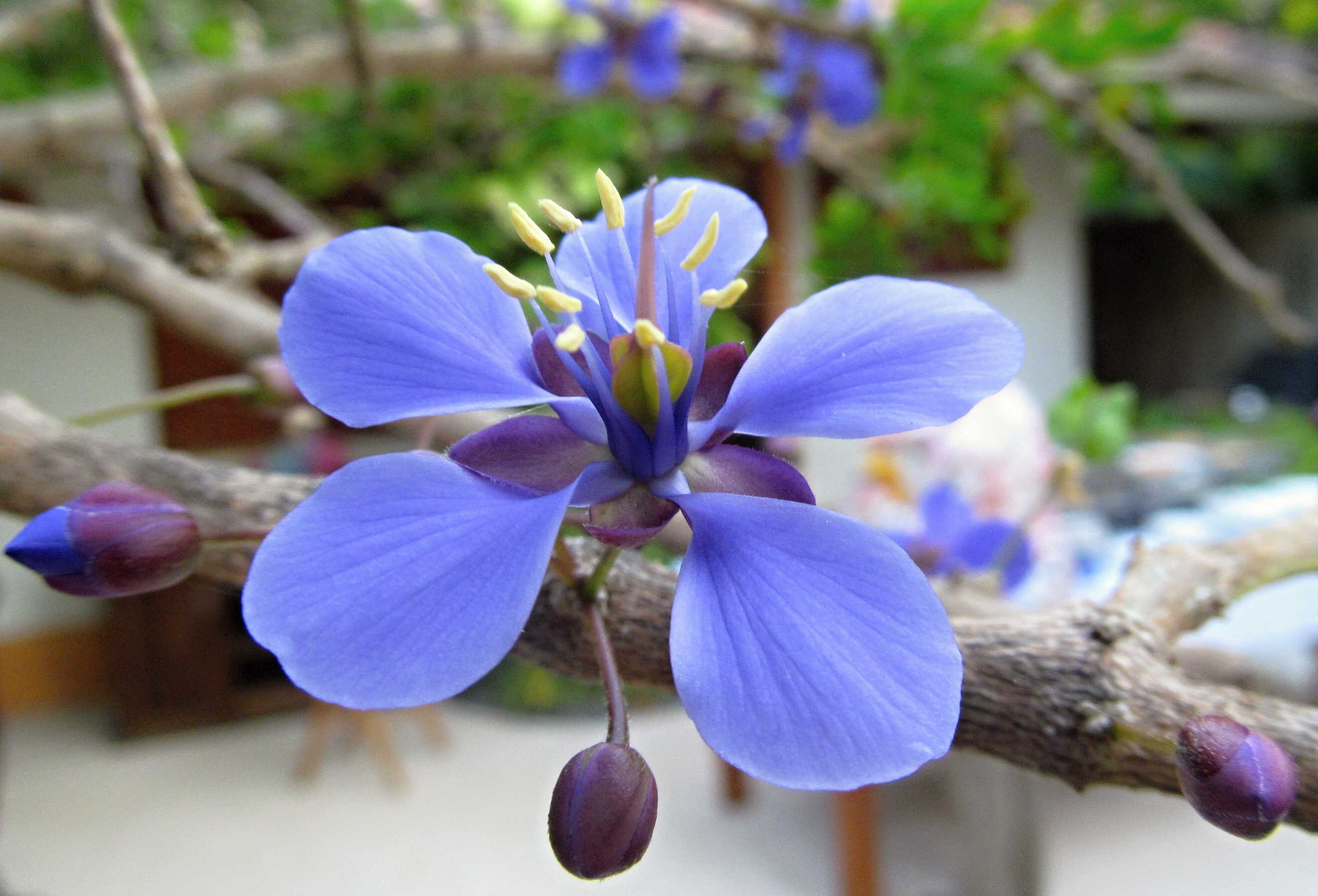

Conservation status
- Vulnerable (IUCN 3.1)

Scientific classification
- Kingdom: Plantae
- Clade: Tracheophytes
- Clade: Angiosperms
- Clade: Eudicots
- Clade: Rosids
- Order: Zygophyllales
- Family: Zygophyllaceae
- Genus: Guaiacum
- Species: G. coulteri

Binomial name
- Guaiacum coulteri A.Gray

= Guaiacum coulteri =

Species of tree

Guaiacum coulteri is a species of flowering plant in the family Zygophyllaceae, that is native to western Mexico and Guatemala.
