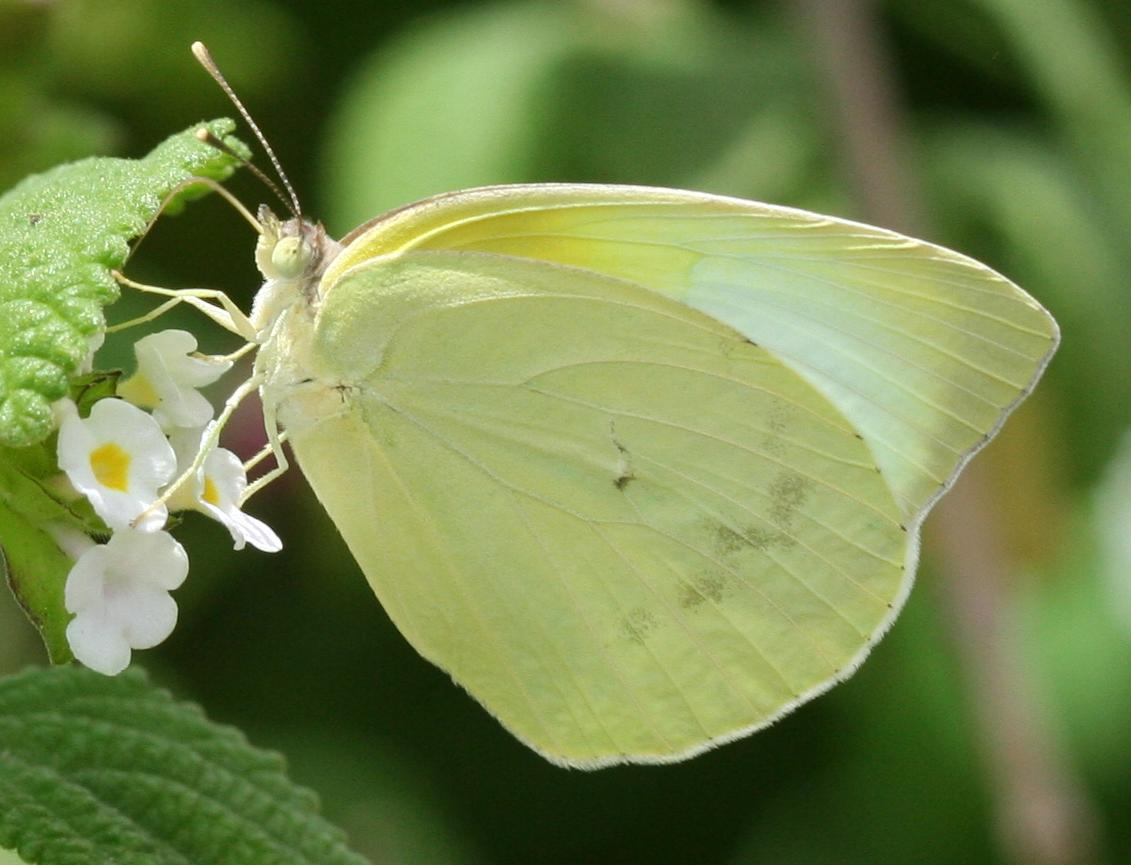
- Kricogonia lyside

Scientific classification
- Kingdom: Animalia
- Phylum: Arthropoda
- Class: Insecta
- Order: Lepidoptera
- Family: Pieridae
- Tribe: Euremini
- Genus: Kricogonia; Reakirt, 1863

Species
- See text

= Kricogonia =

Butterfly genus in family Pieridae

Kricogonia is a genus of butterflies in the family Pieridae. They are native to the Americas.

The genus was erected in 1863 by Tryon Reakirt.

== Species ==
- Kricogonia cabrerai Ramsden, 1920
- Kricogonia lyside (Godart, 1819) – lyside sulphur
