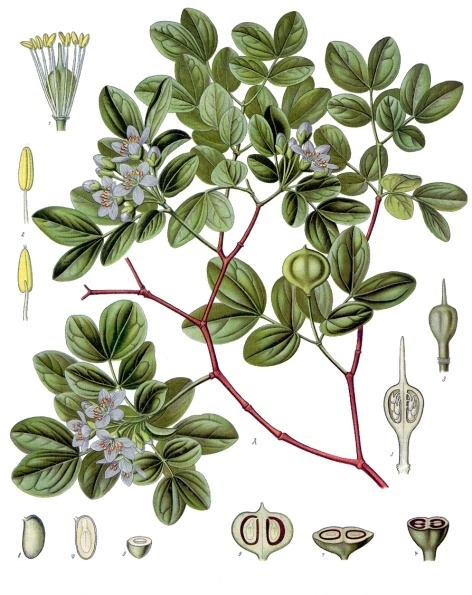

Conservation status
- Endangered (IUCN 3.1)

Scientific classification
- Kingdom: Plantae
- Clade: Tracheophytes
- Clade: Angiosperms
- Clade: Eudicots
- Clade: Rosids
- Order: Zygophyllales
- Family: Zygophyllaceae
- Genus: Guaiacum
- Species: G. officinale

Binomial name
- Guaiacum officinale L.

= Guaiacum officinale =

Species of flowering plant

Guaiacum officinale, commonly known as roughbark lignum-vitae, guaiacwood or gaïacwood, is a species of tree in the caltrop family, Zygophyllaceae, that is native to the Caribbean and the northern coast of South America.

== Description ==
This small tree is very slow growing, reaching about 10 m (33 ft) in height with a trunk diameter of 60 cm (24 in). The tree is essentially evergreen throughout most of its native range. The leaves are compound, 2.5–3 cm (0.98–1.18 in) in length, and 2 cm (0.79 in) wide. The blue flowers have five petals that yield a bright-yellow-orange fruit with red flesh and black seeds.

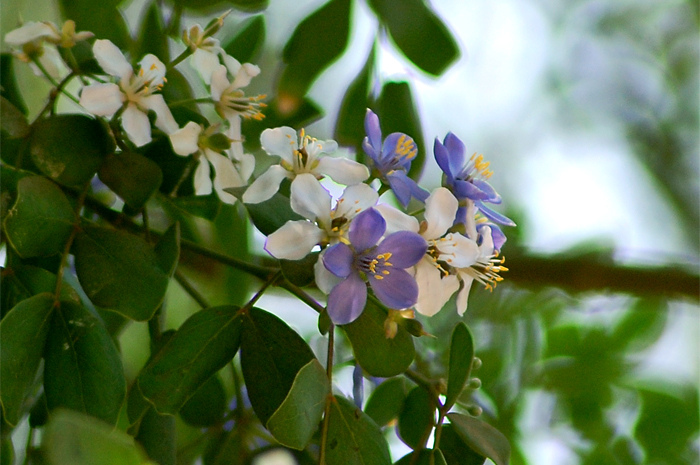
Flowers of G. officinale

== Symbolism ==
Guaiacum officinale is the national flower of Jamaica.

== Uses ==
Guaiacum officinale is one of two species yielding the true lignum vitae, the other being Guaiacum sanctum. Guaiac, a natural resin extracted from the wood, is a colorless compound that turns blue when placed in contact with substances that have peroxidase activity and then are exposed to hydrogen peroxide. Guaiac cards are impregnated with the resin and are used in determining whether stool contains blood. The heme portion of hemoglobin contains peroxidase and will catalyze the oxidation of guaiaconic acid when hydrogen peroxide is placed on the Guaiac card if blood is present in the stool.

== Conservation ==
Roughbark lignum-vitae was listed as an endangered species by the IUCN in 2019. It has been overexploited for its valuable wood and medicinal products. International trade of this species is restricted because of its placement in CITES Appendix II.
