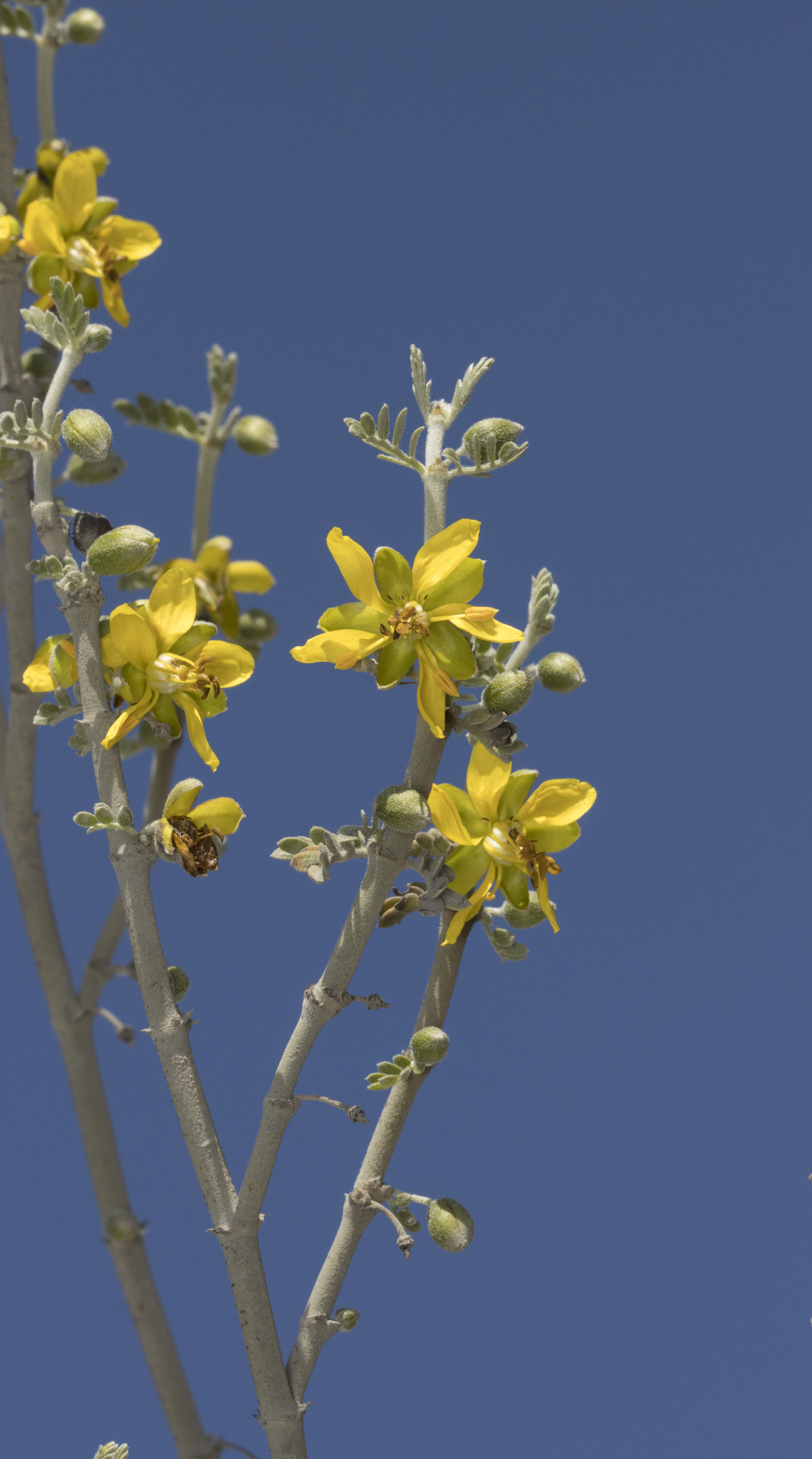

Scientific classification
- Kingdom: Plantae
- Clade: Tracheophytes
- Clade: Angiosperms
- Clade: Eudicots
- Clade: Rosids
- Order: Zygophyllales
- Family: Zygophyllaceae
- Genus: Bulnesia
- Species: B. chilensis

Binomial name
- Bulnesia chilensis Gay

= Bulnesia chilensis =

Species of plant

Bulnesia chilensis is a species of flowering plant in the family Zygophyllaceae. It is shrub endemic to the Atacama and Coquimbo regions in northern Chile, where it is known as retama or retama del cerro.
