= Bulnesia carrapo =

Conservation status
- Least Concern (IUCN 3.1)

Scientific classification
- Kingdom: Plantae
- Clade: Tracheophytes
- Clade: Angiosperms
- Clade: Eudicots
- Clade: Rosids
- Order: Zygophyllales
- Family: Zygophyllaceae
- Genus: Bulnesia
- Species: B. carrapo

Binomial name
- Bulnesia carrapo Killip & Dugand

Species of flowering plant

Bulnesia carrapo is a species of plant in the family Zygophyllaceae. It is endemic to Colombia.
