= Oil of guaiac =

Oil of guaiac is a fragrance ingredient used in soap and perfumery. Despite its name it does not come from the Guaiacum tree, but from the palo santo tree (Bulnesia sarmientoi).

Oil of guaiac is produced through steam distillation of a mixture of wood and sawdust from palo santo. It is sometimes incorrectly called guaiac wood concrete. It is a yellow to greenish yellow semi-solid mass which melts around 40–50 °C. Once melted, it can be cooled back to room temperature yet remain liquid for a long time. Oil of guaiac has a soft roselike odour, similar to the odour of hybrid tea roses or violets. Because of this similarity, it has sometimes been used as an adulterant for rose oil.

Oil of guaiac is primarily composed of 42–72% guaiol, bulnesol, δ-bulnesene, β-bulnesene, α-guaiene, guaioxide and β-patchoulene. It is considered non-irritating, non-sensitizing, and non-phototoxic to human skin.

Oil of guaiac was also a pre-Renaissance remedy to syphilis.

== See also ==
- Guaiacum
