= Lignum vitae =

Type of heavy and hard wood

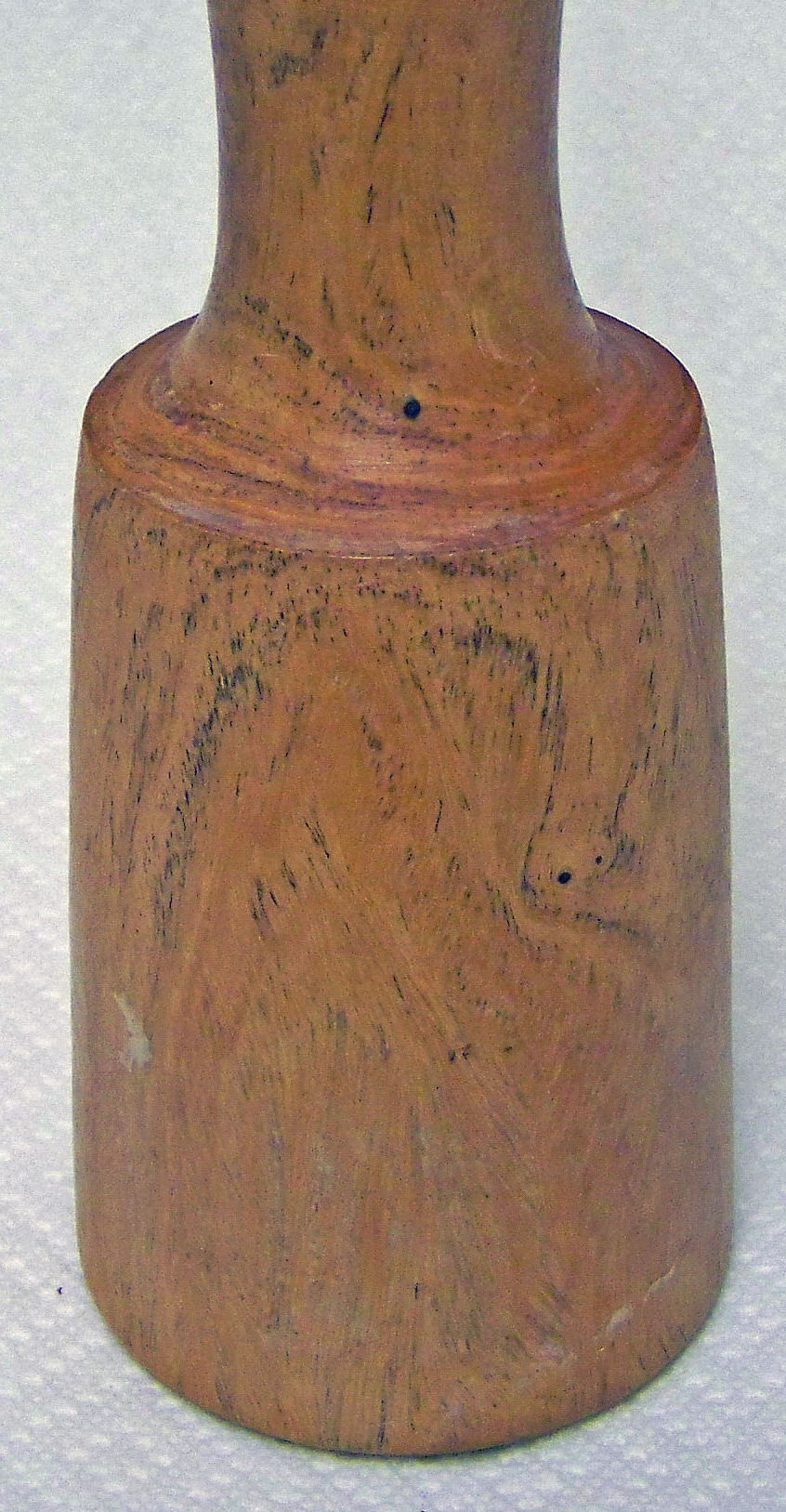
Round mallet of lignum vitae, all sapwood

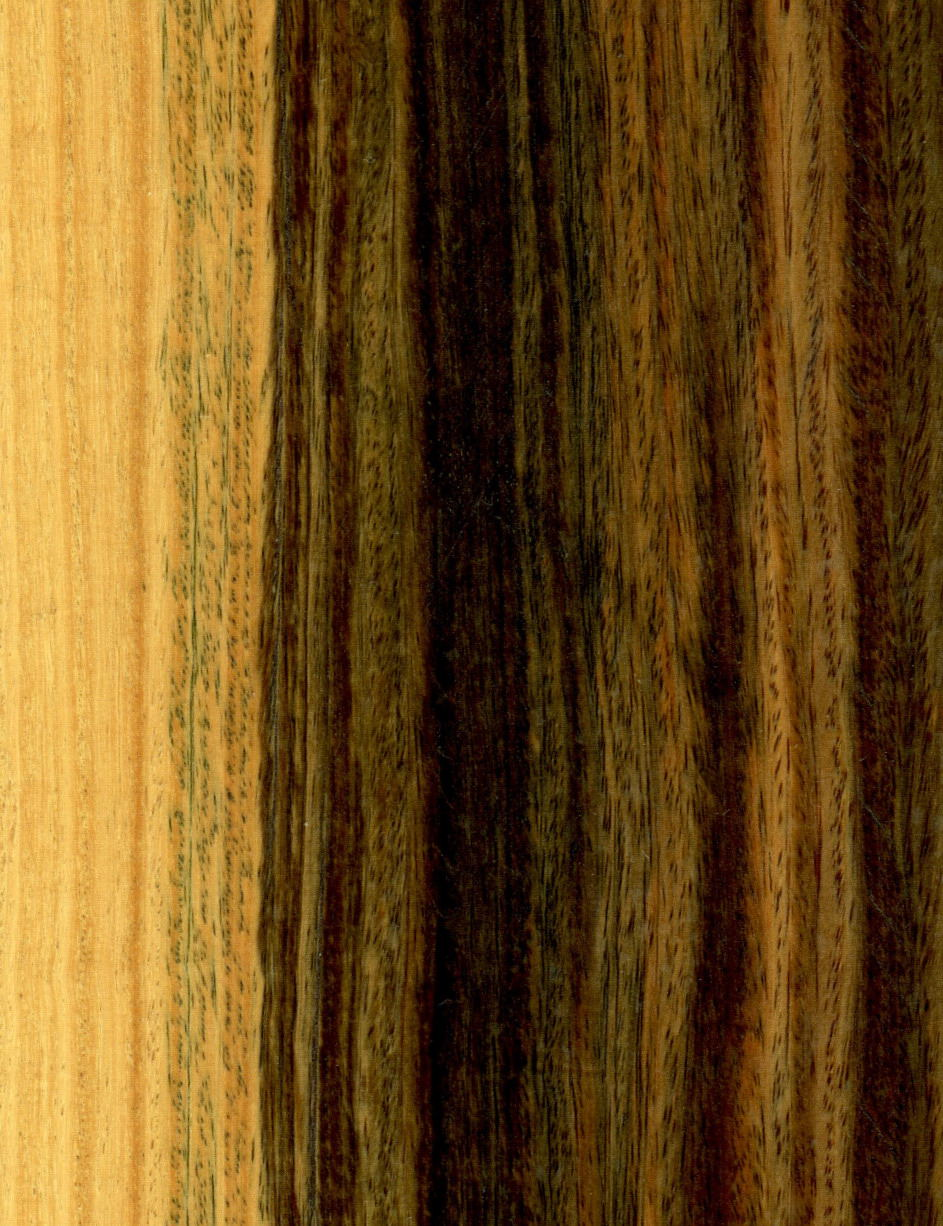
Wood of Bulnesia sarmientoi

Lignum vitae (/ˈlɪɡnəm ˈvaɪti, -ˈviːtaɪ/), also called guayacan or guaiacum, and in parts of Europe known as Pockholz or pokhout, is a wood from trees of the genus Guaiacum. The trees are indigenous to the Caribbean and the northern coast of South America (e.g., Colombia and Venezuela) and have been an important export crop to Europe since the beginning of the 16th century. The wood was once very important for applications requiring a material with its extraordinary combination of strength, toughness, and density.

The wood is obtained chiefly from Guaiacum officinale and Guaiacum sanctum, both small, slow-growing trees. All species of the genus Guaiacum are now listed in Appendix II of CITES (the Convention on International Trade in Endangered Species of Wild Fauna and Flora) as potentially endangered species. G. sanctum is listed as Near Threatened by the IUCN Red List. Demand for the wood has been reduced by modern materials science, which has led to polymers, alloys and composite materials that can take lignum vitae's place.

Various other hardwoods may also be called lignum vitae. The best-known come from Bulnesia arborea and Bulnesia sarmientoi (in the same subfamily as Guaiacum) and are known as verawood or Argentine lignum vitae; they are somewhat similar in appearance and working qualities as genuine lignum vitae. These species are now Plectrocarpa arborea and Plectrocarpa sarmientoi. Some hardwoods from Australasia (e.g., Vitex lignum-vitae and some species of Acacia and Eucalyptus) are also referred to as lignum vitae.

== Name ==
Lignum vitae is Latin for "wood of life". The plant derives its name from its medicinal uses; lignum vitae resin has been used to treat a variety of medical conditions from coughs to arthritis.

Other names for lignum vitae include palo santo (Spanish for "holy stick"), Aura palo santo and "bastard greenheart" (not to be confused with true greenheart Chlorocardium rodiei, a popular wood in shipbuilding, cabinetry, and woodturning but a completely different timber). Lignum vitae is also one of the numerous hard, dense woods loosely referred to as "ironwood".

== Description ==
The tree is slow-growing and relatively small in stature, even when mature and old. It bears small, purplish-blue flowers which result in paired orange dehiscent fruits. The bark is mottled.

=== Wood products ===
Lignum vitae is hard and durable, and is also the densest wood traded (average dried density: ~79 lb/ft^{3} or ~1,260 kg/m^{3}); it will easily sink in water. On the Janka scale of hardness, which measures hardness of woods, lignum vitae ranks highest of the trade woods, with a Janka hardness of 4,390 lbf (19,500 N) (compared with Olneya at 3,260 lbf (14,500 N), African blackwood at 2,940 lbf (13,100 N), hickory at 1,820 lbf (8,100 N), red oak at 1,290 lbf (5,700 N), yellow pine at 690 lbf (3,100 N), and balsa at 100 lbf (440 N)). The densest of all woods is Allocasuarina luehmannii. Krugiodendron typically has a higher density, among many other woods that vary by sample.

== Uses ==
Because of the density of the wood, cricket bails, in particular "heavy bails" used in windy conditions, are sometimes made of lignum vitae. It is also sometimes used to make lawn bowls, croquet mallets, and skittles balls. The wood also has seen widespread historical usage in mortars and pestles and for wood carvers' mallets.

It was the traditional wood used for the British police truncheon until recently because of both its density and its strength, combined with its relative softness compared to metal, thereby tending to bruise rather than cut the skin.

The belaying pins and deadeyes aboard many historic sailing ships were made from lignum vitae. Due to its density and natural oils, they rarely require replacement, despite the severity of typical marine weathering conditions, and also resist jamming in their mortise holes. The sheaves of blocks on sailing vessels were made of lignum vitae until the introduction of modern synthetics.

Lignum vitae's toughness also allows its use as a lap in the process of cutting gems. The wood is covered with powdered industrial diamond, attached to a spindle, and used to smooth rough surfaces of gems.

John Harrison used lignum vitae in the bearings and gears of his pendulum clocks and his first three marine chronometers, as the wood is self-lubricating. The use of lignum vitae eliminates the need for horological lubricating oil; 18th-century horological oil would become viscous and reduce the accuracy of a timepiece under unfavourable conditions, including those that prevail at sea.

For the same reason it was widely used in water-lubricated shaft bearings for ships and hydro-electric power plants and in the stern-tube bearings of ship propeller shafts, until the introduction of sealed white metal bearings in the 1960s. According to the San Francisco Maritime National Park Association Web site, the shaft bearings on the World War II submarine USS Pampanito (SS-383) were made of this wood. The aft main shaft strut bearings for USS Nautilus (SSN-571), the world's first nuclear-powered submarine, were composed of this wood. Also, the bearings in the original 1920s turbines of the Conowingo hydroelectric plant on the lower Susquehanna River were made from lignum vitae. The shaft bearings on the horizontal turbines at the Pointe du Bois generating station in Manitoba are made from lignum vitae. Other hydroelectric plant turbine bearings, many of them still in service, were fabricated with lignum vitae and are too numerous to be listed here.

The United Railroads of San Francisco, a predecessor of the San Francisco Municipal Railway, began installing insulators made of composite materials to support the heavy 600-volt DC feeder wires for their trolley system in 1904. These lines were damaged, along with most everything else, during the 1906 earthquake and the fires that followed. Rebuilding the trolley system and expanding it to replace cable car routes destroyed in the quake created a huge demand for insulators, a demand manufacturers further east were unable to meet. The properties of lignum vitae, namely its ability to withstand high stress (from heavy cables on long spans and the strain of lines rounding corners) and high temperature (from the feeder cables becoming very hot during peak operating hours), and its ready availability from the holds of the ships in the harbor (where it served as dunnage and ballast) made it an ideal "temporary" solution. Many were still in use well into the 1970s, and the final few were replaced with underground feeder systems in the 2000s.

It was also used extensively in the manufacture of British Railways Mark 1 rolling stock, as a "bump stop" in the bogies — the frame that carries the wheels.

== In popular culture ==
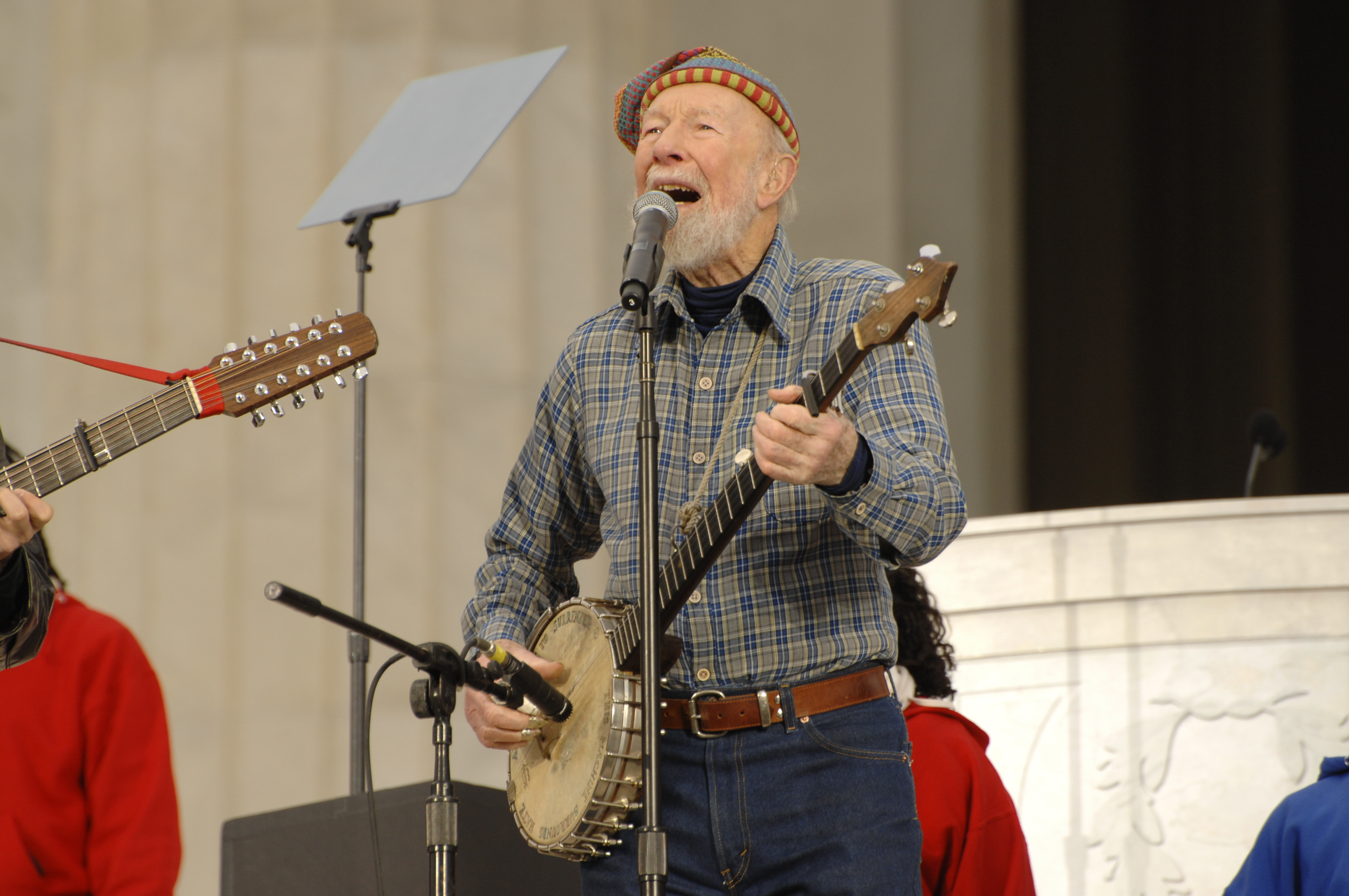
Pete Seeger with his extra-long, lignum vitae banjo neck

Calypsonian/vaudevillian Sam Manning recorded a song titled "Lignum Vitae" in the 1920s.

Benvenuto Cellini recounts using lignum vitae, presumably decocted, to cure himself of a venereal disease, the "French Pox", presumably syphilis.

According to T. H. White's version of the Arthurian legend, The Once and Future King, Merlin's wand is made of lignum vitae and has magical powers.

Gabriel García Márquez's novel Love in the Time of Cholera includes a bathtub made of this wood in one of the main characters' homes. His novel Chronicle of a Death Foretold also refers to the use of this wood in making a cane for the blind Poncio Vicario.

American folksinger Pete Seeger fashioned the neck of his trademark banjo from lignum vitae.

In Charles Dickens' novel Bleak House, one of the characters, Matthew Bagnet is referred to as lignum vitae, "in compliment to the extreme hardness and toughness of his physiognomy."

In Philip Pullman's novel The Secret Commonwealth, the heroine Lyra Belacqua carries a truncheon made from lignum vitae as a weapon.

In Final Fantasy XIV: Shadowbringers, lignum vitae logs are a crafting material commonly used by carpenters.

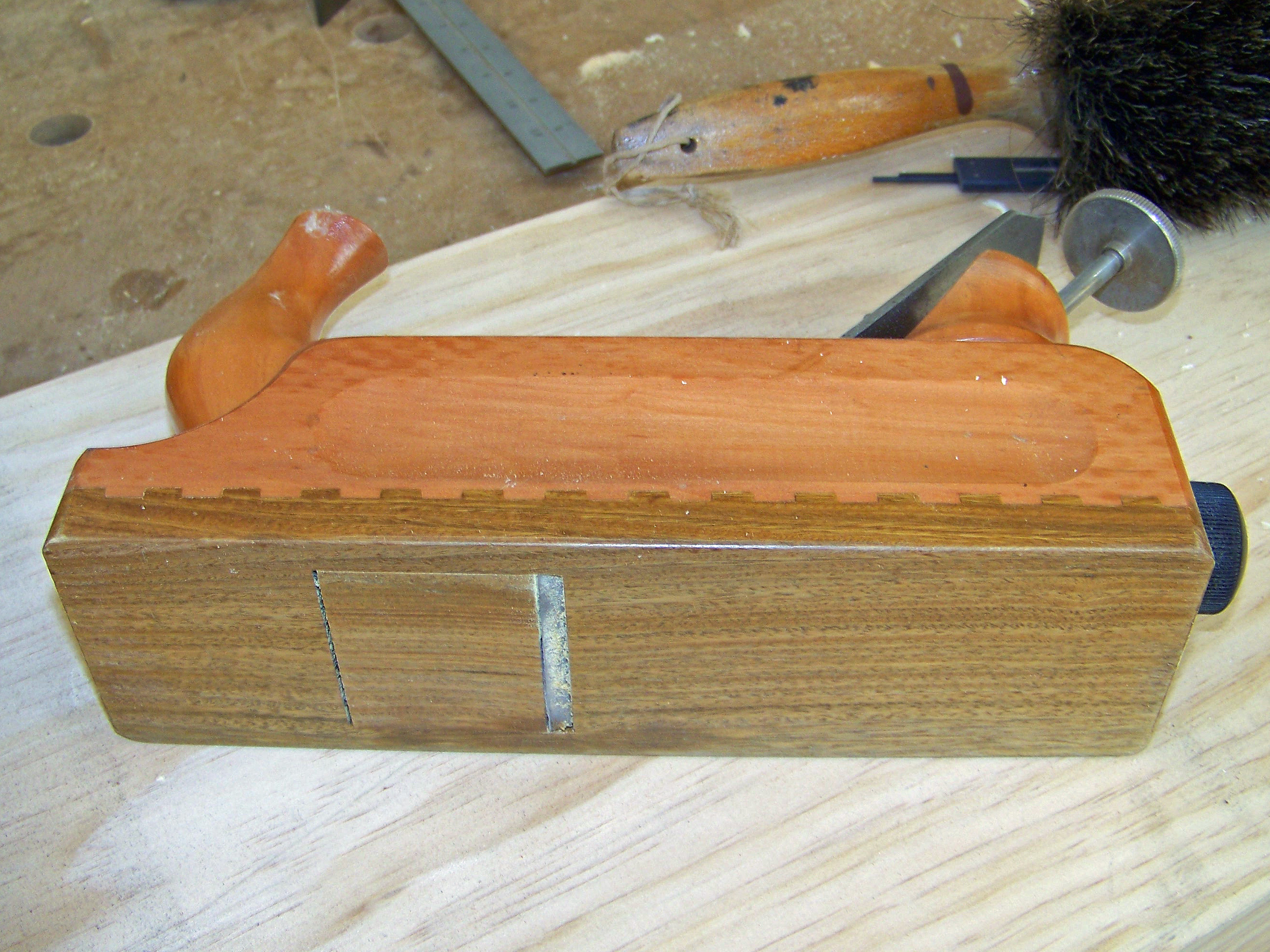
A hand plane with a lignum vitae sole, likely not actual Guaiacum but Bulnesia, and a pearwood body

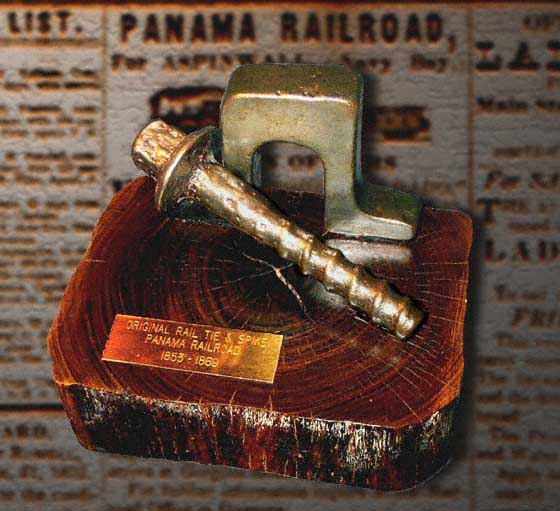
Example of the original construction 53 lb/yd (26 kg/m) inverted "U" rail aka "Bridge" rail, "screw" spike, and lignum vitae tie used to build the Panama Railroad from 1851 to 1855

== See also ==
- Lignum nephriticum
