= Cypress-pine =

Cypress-pine is the common name used for three closely related genera of conifers in the cypress family Cupressaceae:

- Callitris (Australia)
- Actinostrobus (Australia)
- Widdringtonia (Southern Africa)
