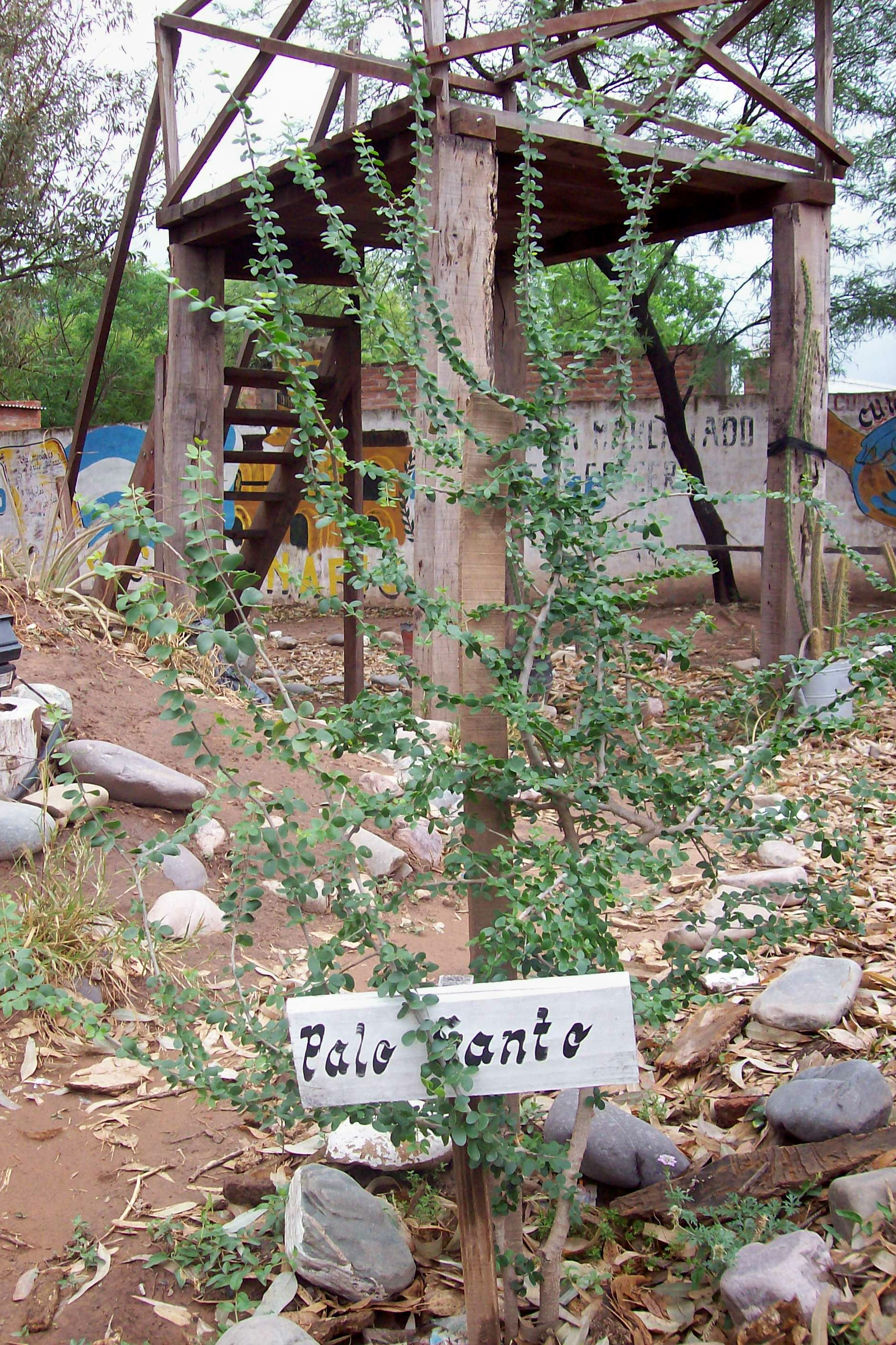

Conservation status
- Endangered (IUCN 3.1)
- CITES Appendix II

Scientific classification
- Kingdom: Plantae
- Clade: Tracheophytes
- Clade: Angiosperms
- Clade: Eudicots
- Clade: Rosids
- Order: Zygophyllales
- Family: Zygophyllaceae
- Genus: Bulnesia
- Species: B. sarmientoi

Binomial name
- Bulnesia sarmientoi Lorentz ex Griseb.

= Bulnesia sarmientoi =

Species of tree

Bulnesia sarmientoi (recently reclassified as Gonopterodendron sarmientoi) is a tree that inhabits a part of the Gran Chaco area in South America, around the Argentina-Bolivia-Paraguay border. Its wood is often traded as "Paraguay lignum vitae", since it has properties and uses similar to the "true" lignum vitae trees of genus Guaiacum, which are close relatives. Another trade name is "vera" or "verawood", which may also refer to the even more closely related B. arborea. Another common but rather ambiguous name is palo santo (Spanish: "holy stick"), which it shares with the species Bursera graveolens.

Bulnesia sarmientoi heartwood is brown, black, and green (varying in color from light olive green to chocolate brown), with streaks. The sapwood is mostly thin and light yellow. The basic specific gravity of this wood is between 0.92 and 1.1 g/cm^{3}.

== Conservation ==
Bulnesia sarmientoi was listed as endangered in the 2018 publication of the IUCN Red List, due to the deforestation of Gran Chaco and a strong global demand for its wood, extracts, and essential oils since 2001. IUCN estimates indicate that over three generations the global population will decline by around 50%. Previously, it was listed as lower risk/conservation dependent in the 1998 publication of the IUCN Red List.

It has been listed in Appendix II of CITES since 2010.

== Uses ==
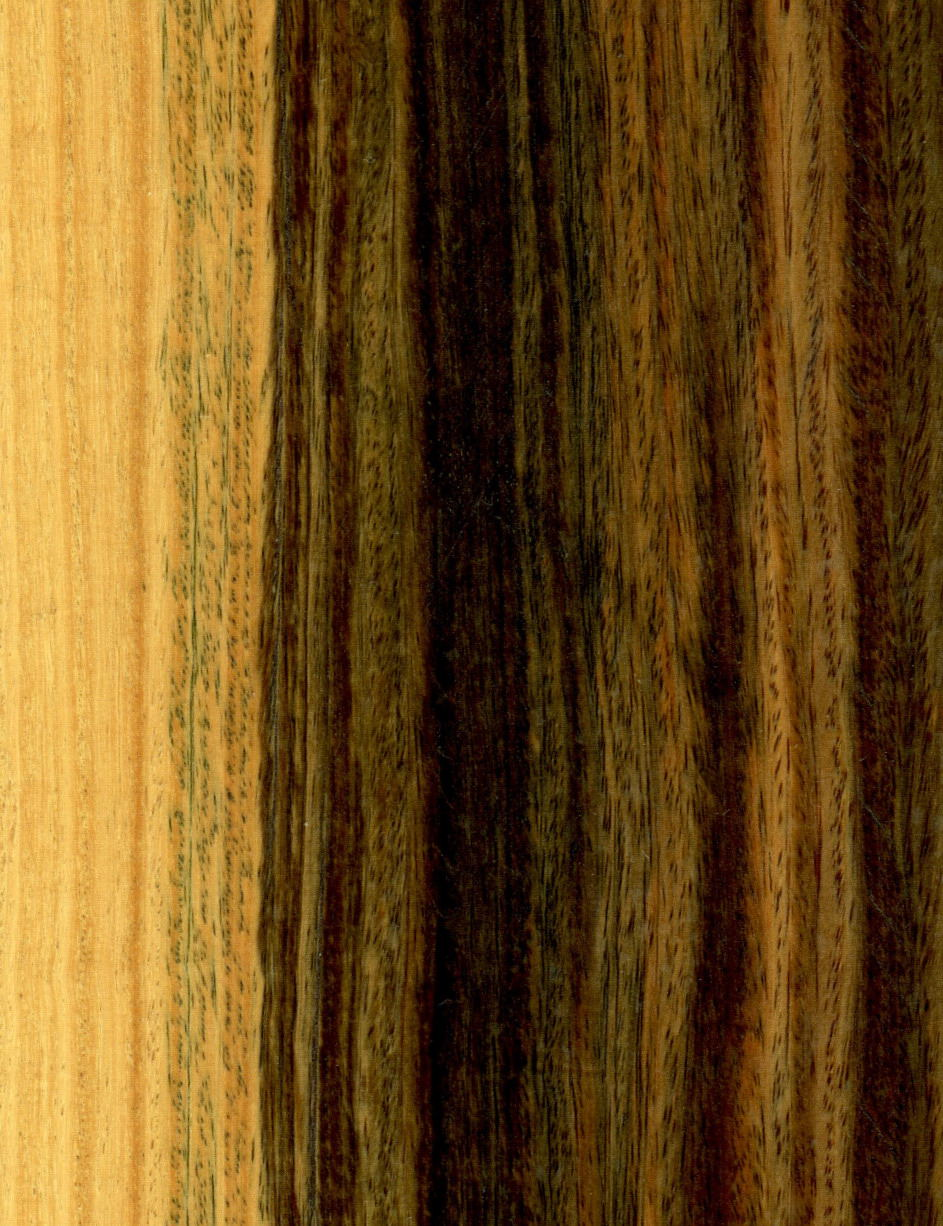
Wood of B. sarmientoi

Palo santo is employed for engraving work and for the making of durable wooden posts. From its wood, also, a type of oil known as oil of guaiac (or guayacol) is produced, to be used as an ingredient for soaps and perfumes. Its resin can be obtained by means of organic solvents, and is employed to make varnishes and dark paints.

Palo santo wood has also been used in indigenous medicine in South America. In northwest Argentina, the Criollo people burned the wood of Aura palo santo together with the leaves of Ruta chalepensis. The resulting smoke was blown into the ears of patients with otitis.

Palo santo is appreciated for the skin-healing properties of its essence and also because it provides good charcoal and a high-quality timber. It ignites easily despite being so dense, and produces a fragrant smoke. Natives of the Chaco region employ the bark to treat stomach problems. Small pieces of the wood are also used as a form of natural incense in spiritual rituals.

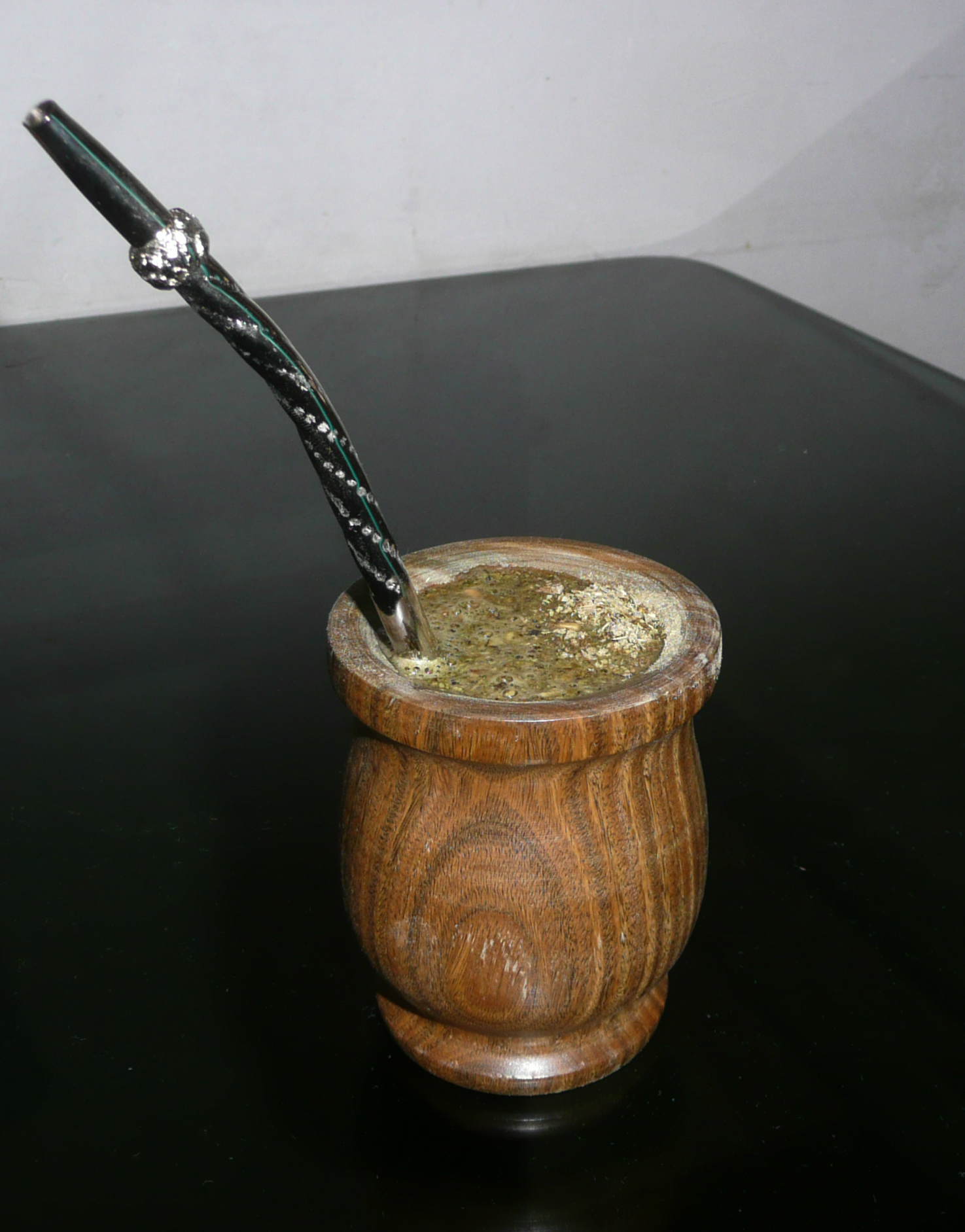
Maté infusion, served in a maté / guampa (traditional maté cup) carved from the wood of B. sarmientoi. In it a metal bombilla (drinking straw), with which to suck up the infusion.

American beer micro brewer Dogfish Head regularly produces a beer called "Palo Santo Marron" that is aged in tanks made of palo santo wood.
