= Stool guaiac test =

Test for the presence for occult blood

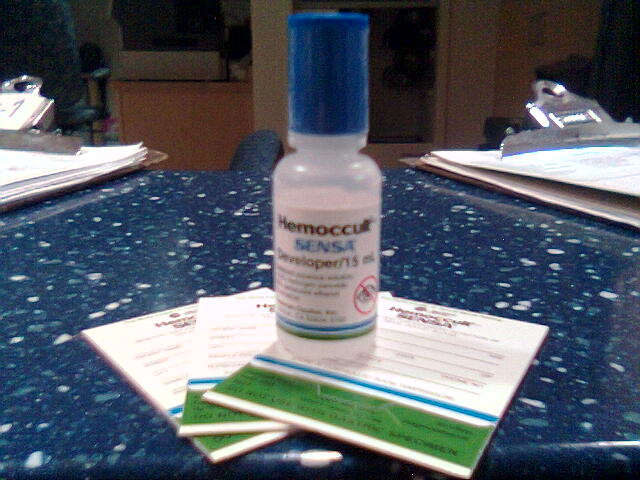
- Guaiac cards and bottle of developer that contains hydrogen peroxide
- MedlinePlus: 003393
- HCPCS-L2: G0394

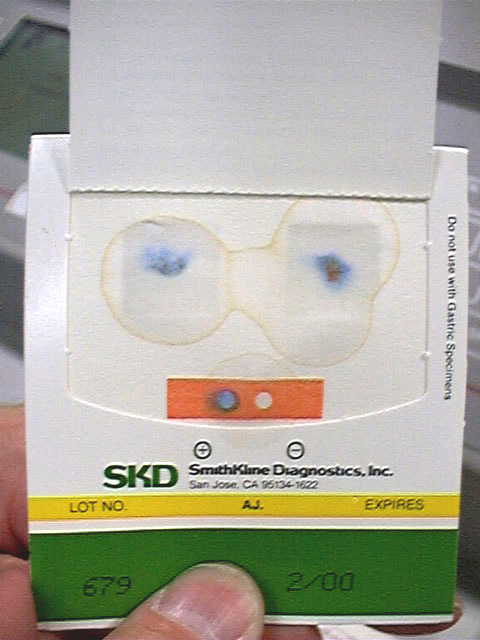
Both square test areas in the upper area of the card show the intense blue color of a positive result. The lower two smaller circular areas on the orange stripe are analytical control reactions, positive on the left and negative on the right, that help assure that the card and developer bottle have been maintained in proper conditions and have not been damaged before the test is performed.

The stool guaiac test or guaiac fecal occult blood test (gFOBT) is one of several methods that detects the presence of fecal occult blood (blood invisible in the feces). The test involves placing a fecal sample on guaiac paper (containing a phenolic compound, alpha-guaiaconic acid, extracted from the wood resin of guaiacum trees) and applying hydrogen peroxide which, in the presence of blood, yields a blue reaction product within seconds.

The American College of Gastroenterology has recommended the abandoning of gFOBT testing as a colorectal cancer screening tool, in favor of the fecal immunochemical test (FIT). Though the FIT is preferred, even the guaiac FOB testing of average risk populations may have been sufficient to reduce the mortality associated with colon cancer by about 25%. With this lower efficacy, it was not always cost effective to screen a large population with gFOBT.

== Methodology ==
The stool guaiac test involves certain medication and dietary restrictions to avoid false positive and false negative results. Medications that can potentially cause false positives include: aspirin, warfarin, heparin, clopidogrel, NSAIDs, and SSRIs. Certain fruits and vegetables are high in peroxidases which can yield false positives. These include: broccoli, cauliflower, horseradish, turnips, cantaloupe, parsnip, and red radish. Cooking deactivates the peroxidases, as does stomach acid. In individuals with normal stomach acid production, large amounts (>750g) of such raw fruits and vegetables can interfere with results. Red meat can also yield a false positive due to the peroxidase activity of its heme (particularly if it is only cooked rare). Vitamin C can yield a false negative, but only in high amounts (e.g. supplementation, large quantities of citrus fruits). Red meat is recommended to be avoided for at least 3 days before the test. It has been suggested that cucumber, cauliflower and horseradish, and often other vegetables, should be avoided for three days before the test.

In testing, feces are applied to a thick piece of paper attached to a thin film coated with guaiac. Either the patient or medical professional smears a small fecal sample on to the film. The fecal sample is obtained by catching the stool and transferring a sample with an applicator. Digital rectal examination specimens are also used but this method is discouraged for colorectal cancer screening due to very poor performance characteristics.

Both sides of the test card can be peeled open, to access the inner guaiac paper. One side of the card is marked for application of the stool and the other is for the developer fluid.

After applying the feces, one or two drops of hydrogen peroxide are then dripped on to the other side of the film, and it is observed for a rapid blue color change.

== Chemistry ==
When the hydrogen peroxide is dripped on to the guaiac paper, it oxidizes the alpha-guaiaconic acid to a blue colored quinone. Normally, when no blood and no peroxidases or catalases from vegetables are present, this oxidation occurs very slowly. Heme, a component of hemoglobin found in blood, catalyzes this reaction, giving a result in about two seconds. Therefore, a positive test result is one where there is a quick and intense blue color change of the film.

Proposed oxidations of compounds in guaiac oil as explanation for the formation of the blue bis-methylenequinone as part of the guaiac test.

== Analytical interpretation ==
The guaiac test can often be false-positive which is a positive test result when there is in fact no source of bleeding. This is particularly common if the recommended dietary preparation is not followed, as the heme in red meat or the peroxidase or catalase activity in vegetables, especially if uncooked, can cause analytical false positives.

Vitamin C can cause analytical false negatives due to its anti-oxidant properties inhibiting the color reaction.

If the card has not been promptly developed, the water content of the feces decreases, and this can reduce the detection of blood. Although rehydration of stored samples can reverse this effect this is not recommended because the test becomes unduly analytically sensitive and thus much less specific.

Some stool specimens have a high bile content that causes a green color to show after applying the developer drops. If entirely green, such samples are negative, but if questionably green to blue, such samples are designated positive.

The package insert guidelines from the manufacturers, for example Hemoccult SENSA, recommend that nonsteroidal anti-inflammatory drugs (NSAID), such as ibuprofen and aspirin, and iron supplements be discontinued for at least several days before the tests. There is a concern that these agents may irritate the body and cause biologically positive tests even in the absence of a more substantial illness, but there is some doubt about how frequently this occurs with NSAID medication. Although both iron and bismuth containing products such as antacids and antidiarrheals can cause dark stools that are occasionally confused as containing blood, actual bleeding from iron is unusual.

There is no consensus on whether to stop warfarin before a guaiac test. Even when using anticoagulants a high proportion of positive guaiac tests were found to be due to diagnosable lesions, suggesting anticoagulants may not cause bleeding unless there is an abnormality.

== Clinical application ==
The article fecal occult blood (FOB) provides an expanded consideration of the clinical application of FOB tests generally, including other clinical methods, and the comments here are those that relate specifically to the guaiac gFOBT method.

One major use of stool testing for blood is detection of colorectal cancer. However, other possible positive results include: gastroesophageal cancer, GI bleeds, diverticulae, hemorrhoids, anal fissures, colon polyps, ulcerative colitis, Crohn's disease, celiac disease, GERD, esophagitis, peptic ulcers, gastritis, inflammatory bowel disease, vascular ectasias, portal hypertensive gastropathy, aortoenteric fistulas, hemobilia, endometriosis, and trauma.

The stool guaiac test was originally the principal colon cancer screening technology available, but modern tests which look for globin or DNA are now also available. Several recent colon cancer screening guidelines have recommended replacing any older low-sensitivity, guaiac-based fecal occult blood testing (gFOBT) with either newer high-sensitivity guaiac-based fecal occult blood testing (gFOBT) or fecal immunochemical testing (FIT), which tests for globin rather than the heme detected by the guaiac method. The US Multisociety Task Force (MSTF) looked at 6 studies that compared high sensitivity gFOBT (Hemoccult SENSA) to FIT, and concluded that there were no clear difference in overall performance between these methods, and a similar recommendation was made by the National Guideline Clearinghouse (NGC).

Results of a single fecal sample should be interpreted cautiously, as there is a high rate of false negativity associated with the test. Using three cards, each on a different day, is recommended to improve sensitivity. The Centers for Disease Control and Prevention (CDC) in a 2006–2007 survey found extensive inappropriate use of low sensitivity gFOBT and of single specimens; it is unclear if these widespread suboptimal approaches have since declined. The Current Procedural Terminology (CPT) coding was changed in January 2006 to include CPT code 82270, which indicates that consecutive collection of three stool samples has occurred, either as three single cards or a single triple card. Since January 2007, the US Medicare program reimburses for colorectal cancer screening with gFOBT only when this code is used.

The stool guaiac test method may be preferable to fecal immunochemical testing (FIT) if there is a clinical concern about possible gastric or proximal upper intestinal bleeding. However, although heme breakdown is less than globin during intestinal transit, false negative results can be seen with the stool guaiac tests due to degradation of the peroxidase-activity. This can cause false negative results in upper gastrointestinal bleeding sources, or in right colon adenomas and cancers that have comparable blood losses to positively testing left colon lesions. A positive gFOBT with subsequent negative colonoscopy may lead to an upper endoscopy. It is unclear whether this is an effective intervention if there is a positive gFOBT but no anemia. Endoscopy when there is a positive gFOBT along with iron deficiency anemia, or iron deficiency anemia on its own, has a higher rate of finding problems.
