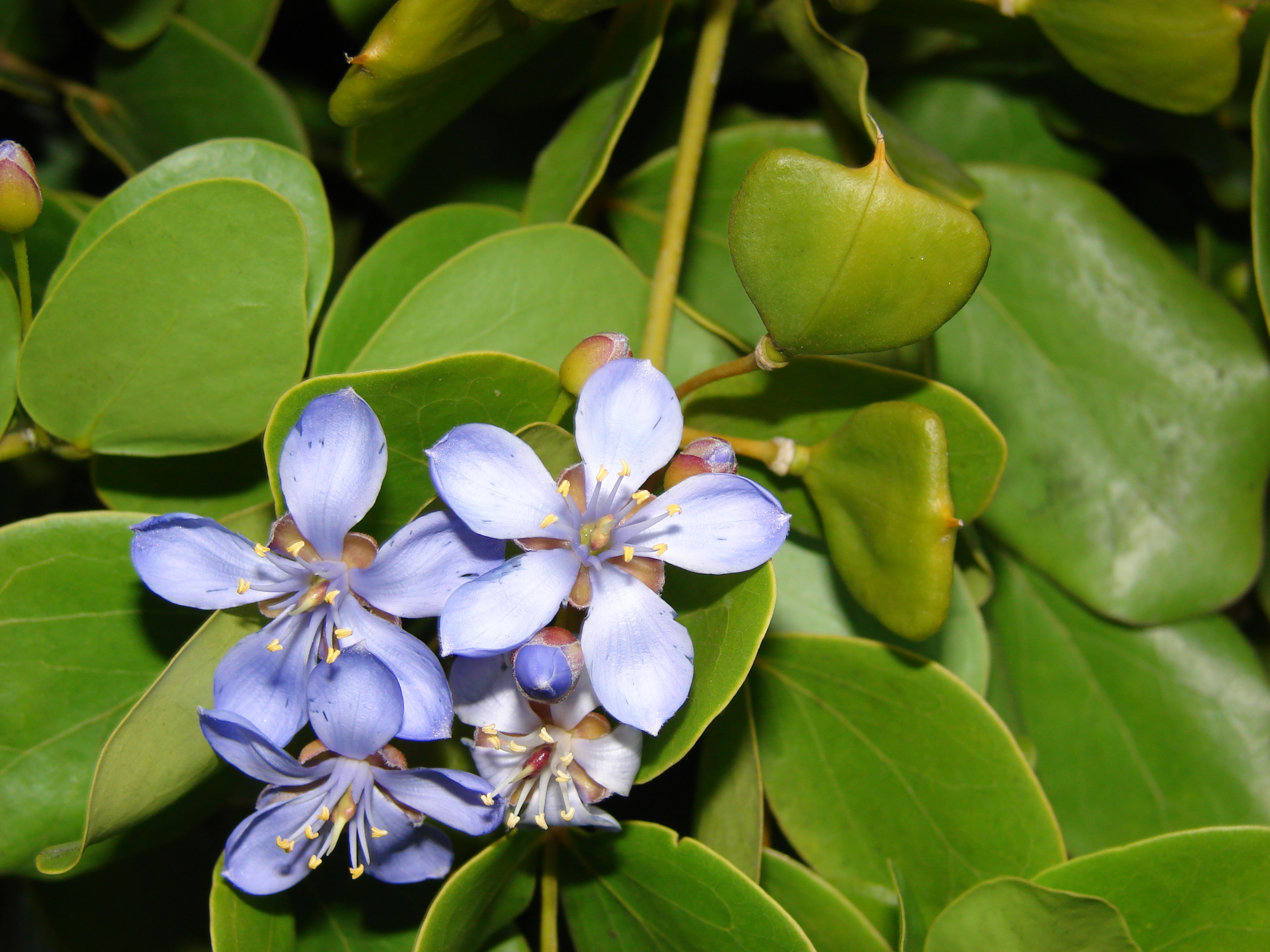
- Guaiacum officinale

Conservation status
- CITES Appendix II

Scientific classification
- Kingdom: Plantae
- Clade: Tracheophytes
- Clade: Angiosperms
- Clade: Eudicots
- Clade: Rosids
- Order: Zygophyllales
- Family: Zygophyllaceae
- Subfamily: Larreoideae
- Genus: Guaiacum; Plum. ex L.

Type species
- Guaiacum sanctum L.

Species
- Guaiacum angustifolium Engelm.; Guaiacum coulteri A.Gray; Guaiacum nellii (G.Navarro) Christenh. & Byng; Guaiacum officinale L.; Guaiacum palmeri Vail; Guaiacum sanctum L.; Guaiacum unijugum Brandegee

Synonyms
- Guajacum Plum. ex L., orth. var.; Izozogia G.Navarro

= Guaiacum =

Genus of flowering plants

Guaiacum (/ˈɡwaɪ.ə.kəm/), sometimes spelled Guajacum, is a genus of flowering plants in the caltrop family Zygophyllaceae. It contains five species of slow-growing shrubs and trees, reaching a height of approximately 20 m (66 ft) but usually less than half of that. All are native to subtropical and tropical regions of the Americas and are commonly known as lignum-vitae, guayacán (Spanish), or gaïac (French). The genus name originated in Taíno, the language spoken by the native Taínos of the Bahamas; it was adopted into English in 1533, the first word in that language of American origin.

Members of the genus have a variety of uses, including as lumber, for medicinal purposes, and as ornamentals. The trade of all species of Guaiacum is controlled under CITES Appendix II.

Guaiacum officinale is the national flower of Jamaica, while Guaiacum sanctum is the national tree of the Bahamas.

== Uses ==
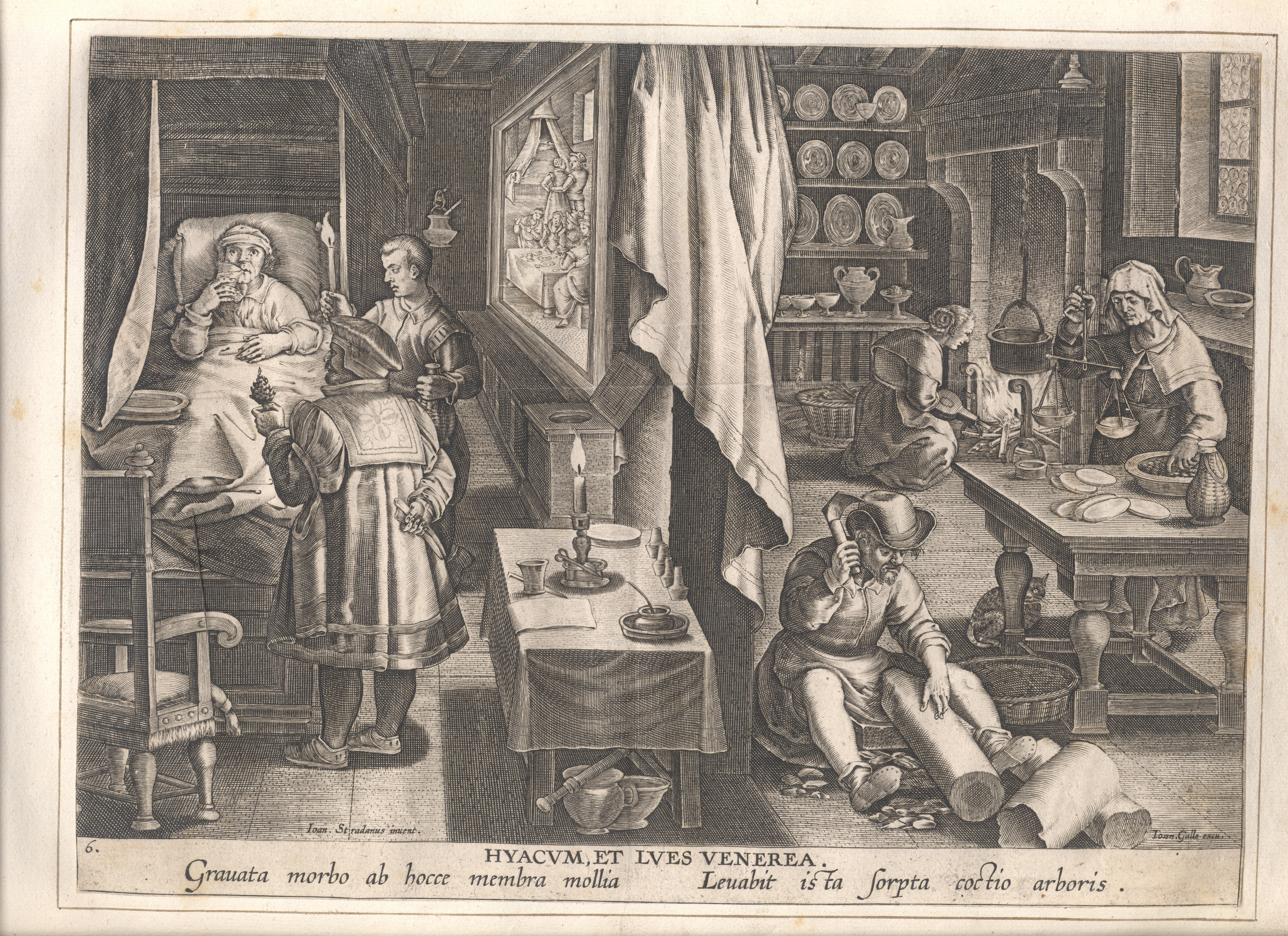
The invention of the use of Guaiacum for syphilis

The genus is famous as the supplier of lignum vitae, which is the wood of several species in the genus. It is the fourth-hardest variety of wood as measured by the Janka hardness test, requiring a force of 4,500 lb_{f} (20,000 N) to embed a steel ball 0.444 in (1.13 cm) in diameter half that distance into the wood.

As a food additive, Guaiacum is designated E314 and classified as an antioxidant.The soap fragrance oil of guaiac comes from Bulnesia sarmientoi, a South American tree from the same family.

Members of the genus are grown in Florida and California as ornamental plants.

=== As medicine ===
The Spanish encountered guaiacum wood when they conquered San Domingo in the sixteenth century, and it was soon brought back to Europe where epidemic syphilis had been raging for decades. The gum extracted from guiacum quickly acquired a reputation as a cure for syphilis, a practice Benvenuto Cellini records in his memoirs. Thomas Nashe referred to its supposed medical properties in his tract Nashe's Lenten Stuff, alluding to the exotic sound of the word itself: "Physicians deafen our ears with the honorificabilitudinitatibus of their heavenly panacaea, their sovereign guiacum." The detailed engraving, Preparation and Use of Guayaco for Treating Syphilis, published by Philips Galle after a design by the Flemish artist Jan van der Straet, depicts four servants preparing a concoction of gum guiacum for their wealthy master under the supervision of a physician. Paracelsus, the famous if controversial Swiss physician, disputed the effectiveness of this treatment and was censured for his criticism.

Gum guaiacum was used to stimulate menstruation; in a 1793 Virginia court case, Martha Jefferson Randolph testified that she had provided gum guaiacum to a female relative to "produce an abortion", suggesting that it was also used as an abortifacient.

In A Treatise of the Materia Medica (1789), Scottish physician William Cullen noted: "Several physicians have apprehended mischief from the use of the guaiacum in a spirituous tincture."

The 1955 edition of the Textbook of Pharmacognosy states: "Guaiacum has a local stimulant action which is sometimes useful in sore throat. The resin is used in chronic gout and rheumatism, whilst the wood is an ingredient in the compound concentrated solution of sarsaparilla, which was formerly much used as an alternative in syphilis."

A phenolic compound derived from the resin of Guaiacum trees is used in a common test for blood in human stool samples. The presence of heme in the blood causes the formation of a coloured product in the presence of hydrogen peroxide. The effect of peroxidases in horseradish on guaiacum was first noted in 1810.

A widely used derivative drug is the expectorant known as guaifenesin.

== Species ==
Seven species are accepted.

Image	Scientific name	Common name	Distribution
	Guaiacum angustifolium Engelm.	Texas Lignum-vitae	Texas, Northeastern Mexico
	Guaiacum coulteri A.Gray	Sonoran Lignum-vitae	Western Mexico, Guatemala
	Guaiacum nellii (G.Navarro) Christenh. & Byng		Bolivia (Santa Cruz Department)
	Guaiacum officinale L.	Common Lignum-vitae	The Caribbean, Northern South America
	Guaiacum palmeri Vail		northwestern Mexico (Sonora)
	Guaiacum sanctum L.	Holywood Lignum-vitae	Southern Florida, The Bahamas, Southern Mexico, Central America, Greater Antilles
	Guaiacum unijugum Brandegee		Northwestern Mexico

=== Formerly placed here ===
- Porlieria microphylla (Baill.) Descole et al. (as G. microphyllum Baill.)
- Schotia afra (L.) Thunb. (as G. afrum L.)
