= John Nicholls (surgeon) =

British colorectal surgeon

Ralph John Nicholls (born 20 May 1943), MA, MChir, FRCS (Eng), EBSQ is a retired British colorectal surgeon, Emeritus Consultant Surgeon at St Mark's Hospital London and Professor of Colorectal Surgery, Imperial College London.

R. John Nicholls is best known for his work in the development of ileal pouch surgery. With the introduction of ileal-anal pouch surgery, selected patients with ulcerative colitis and familial adenomatous polyposis (FAP) requiring surgery can be treated by removing the diseased large intestine including the colon and rectum while preserving the anus, thereby avoiding a permanent stoma (ileostomy). This revolutionary operation challenged the conventional procedure used at the time, total procotocolectomy, which included removal of the anal sphincter leaving the patient with an ileostomy for life.

The technique of ileal pouch-anal anastomosis (IPAA) surgery, also known as restorative procotocolectomy (RPC) consists of removal of the diseased colon and rectum, immediately followed by the creation of a surgical join (anastomosis) between the small intestine (ileum) above and the anus below. The reservoir function of the rectum lost by its removal was replaced by the surgical construction of a 'new' rectum made from the ileum to form a so-called "ileal pouch". This allowed the patient requiring surgery for ulcerative colitis and some with familial adenomatous polyposis to avoid a permanent ileostomy by enabling the storage of stool in the pouch as would normally occur in the rectum to be followed by defaecation through the anus at the patient's convenience.

The drive behind creating and developing ileo-anal pouch surgery was to improve the quality of life for select patients who required surgery for their condition and were medically suitable to undergo the procedure. The decision to undergo the pouch operation was made by the patient based on objective information and their preference between life with a permanent ileostomy or the preservation of defaecation through the anus, in each case with the removal of the disease.

The Kock pouch procedure developed by Finnish surgeon Nils Kock first reported in Sweden in 1969 which is a continent ileostomy, was also an attempt to improve the patient's quality of life, but it still required an opening of the bowel onto the abdominal wall, rather than preservation of the normal route of defaecation through the anus as in restorative proctocolectomy.

== Career ==
=== Training and early appointments ===
Born in Wilby, England, Nicholls attended Felsted School and went on to study medicine at Gonville and Caius College in the University of Cambridge.

He completed his clinical training and surgical residency at the London Hospital (known from 1990 as the Royal London Hospital) and became a Fellow of the Royal College of Surgeons in England in 1972. It was at the London Hospital, that Nicholls trained under British surgeon Sir Alan Parks.

Parks operated on his first ileo-anal pouch patient in 1976 at the London Hospital and subsequently at St Mark's Hospital where he was also a consultant. Nicholls was his first assistant having spent 1976 carrying out research under Fritz Linder on an Alexander von Humboldt Fellowship in the Department of Surgery at the Heidelberg University in Germany. Nicholls became a Resident Surgical Officer at St Mark's on his return to the UK in 1977. He was also a consultant surgeon to St Thomas' Hospital, London, from 1982 to 1993 when he left to become Dean of St Mark's.

== Beginning of ileal pouch surgery ==
=== The "straight" ileoanal procedure ===
The ileal pouch-anal anastomosis (IPAA) procedure was an advancement from the "straight" ileoanal anastomosis procedure original described by the German surgeon Nissen in 1934 and resurrected by the Americans Ravitch and Sabiston in 1947. They described the total removal of the colon and rectum with restoration of intestinal continuity by means of a 'straight' ileo-anal anastomosis without any formation of an ileal pouch or reservoir. The procedure resulted for many patients in high frequency and urgency of defaecation day and night which made life difficult.

=== The Kock reservoir ===
The Kock pouch involved first the removal of the colon, rectum, and anus as treatment of the disease. Next, using the last 45 centimetres of the ileum, the construction of an ileal pouch with a valve designed only to allow drainage of its contents when a catheter was passed through the stoma on the abdominal wall. This allowed many patients to have control over their life by being able to evacuate stool at a time of their choosing.

=== Restorative proctocolectomy with ileal pouch, and ileo-anal anastomosis (IPAA) ===
When Koch showed that the creation of an ileal reservoir in humans did not compromise the patient's health, Alan Parks recognised that the combination of total surgical removal of the disease by excision of the colon and rectum while preserving the anal sphincter, combined with an ileal pouch to replace the lost reservoir capacity of the rectum might achieve the two aims of cure of the disease and acceptable bowel function. A reservoir or "pouch" made from the last 40–50 centimetres of the small bowel (ileum) after excision of the colon and rectum was joined to the anus by an ileo-anal anastomosis.

This not only preserved anal function but the creation of a reservoir was shown to reduce the frequency of defaecation compared with function after a 'straight' iloeanal anastomosis. The operation is known by several names globally today including ileal pouch, Parks' pouch, pelvic pouch, S-pouch, J-pouch, W-pouch, Ileal Pouch Anal Anastomosis (IPAA) and restorative proctocolectomy (RPC). It is also now performed for a number of conditions beyond ulcerative colitis and familial adenomatous polyposis (FAP) including accident or injury, infection, allergic reaction, toxic mega colon, and cancer among others.

Parks and Nicholls published the seminal article on ileo-anal pouch surgery entitled "Proctocolectomy without ileostomy for ulcerative colitis" in 1978 published by the British Medical Journal. Articles that followed in the surgical literature mainly centred on clinical results including complications and function. This was followed by period of time during which the shape and size of the reservoir became and area of interest. Parks' original design, the so-called "S-pouch", was often followed by difficulty in evacuation of stool due to the retention of a short segment of ileum anastomosed at the anal canal. The "J-pouch" described by Utsunomiya in 1980 largely avoided this problem.

The demonstration of an inverse relationship between the capacity of the pouch and the frequency of defaecation led to further designs including the W-pouch described by Nicholls led to further designs including the W-pouch he described in 1987 which was free from defaecation difficulty and appeared also to be followed by fewer bowel actions per 24 hours than the J-pouch.

== Professorship and accolades ==
Following the unexpected death of Alan Parks on November 3, 1982, Nicholls became the most active pouch surgeon in the United Kingdom. At this time he was still a mid-career surgeon but he had been working with the operation since its inception when he was still a senior registrar (chief resident).

By the early 1980s, the ileal pouch procedure had become part of specialist colorectal surgical practices worldwide. In the United States the Australian-born surgeon Victor Warren Fazio at the Cleveland Clinic and Roger Dozois at the Mayo Clinic began publishing on the operation in the early 1980s greatly increasing its diffusion and there was generous co-operation among these units, St Mark's and colorectal departments in Canada (Zane Cohen), France (Rolland Parc) and Italy (Gilberto Poggioli).

Nicholls' other contributions to coloproctology include aspects of rectal cancer related to staging, local surgery, and radiotherapy and his collaboration with Professor Michael Kamm in the field of incontinence. He was a founding member of the European Society of Coloproctology and was first secretary of the Division of Colorectal Surgery of the Union Européenne des Médecins Specialistes (UEMS) which instigated accreditation and certification for colorectal surgery. He was the founder of the International Journal of Colorectal Disease and was its editor from 1986 to 1999. He then established the journal Colorectal Disease of which he was Editor-in-Chief until his retirement in 2014, during which time the Impact Factor rose to be the second of colorectal journals worldwide.

Nicholls became Dean of St Mark's from 1987 and held the position until 1997. From 1997 to 2001, he was the Clinical Director of St Mark's Hospital. During this time (from 1997 to 2001), Nicholls was additionally a member of the Specialist Advisory Committee in General Surgery for Higher Surgical Training in Great Britain and Ireland. In 1993 he with his colleague James Thomson, the Clinical Director of St Mark's at the time, created the St Mark's Academic Institute. He was appointed Professor of Colorectal Surgery in Imperial College London in 1997 and was Chairman of the Board of Trustees of Northwick Park Institute for Medical Research from 2008 to 2016.

Fellowships have been awarded to him by many professional bodies including the Royal College of Physicians of London, the American College of Surgeons, the American Society of Colon and Rectal Surgeons, the surgical Royal Colleges of Edinburgh, Ireland and Glasgow, l'Academie Nationale de Chirurgie, the British Society of Gastroenterology (BSG) and the national colorectal societies in Italy, France, Brazil, Spain, Austria, Switzerland, Yugoslavia, Chile, Argentina, Canada, Australia and Poland. He is able to lecture in French, German and Italian.

Nicholls was the President of the Association of Coloproctology of Great Britain and Ireland in 2000 and of the European Association of Coloproctology in 2004. With the formation of the European Society of Coloproctology in 2005, which he joined as a founder, he became the Chairman of the Scientific Committee responsible for the scientific programme of the meetings. On September 25, 2026, Nicholls was presented with a Lifetime Achievement Award for his career demonstrating exceptional and enduring contributions through leadership, education, innovation and service plus lasting impact in the field of coloproctology by the European Society of Coloproctology (ESCP). He retired from NHS practice in 2006 but kept active in the field of colorectal surgery until his full retirement in 2014. Nicholls has authored over 300 publications and four books.

Nicholls remains a Patron of the Red Lion Group (RLG), a national support group and charity for people with pouches founded by a group of St Mark's staff and patients in 1994. He had an instrumental role in the launch of the Red Lion Group helping it to be based at St Mark's Hospital and served as the first President of the Red Lion Group from 1994 until Nicholls' retirement from the National Health Service (NHS) in 2006. Thereafter, he remained active in research and teaching until his full retirement in 2014.

== See also ==
- Nils Kock
- Victor Fazio
- Conor P. Delaney
