= Alan Parks =

British surgeon

Sir Alan Guyatt Parks FRCP FRCPE FRCS (19 December 1920 – 3 November 1982) was a British colorectal surgeon, who served as president of the Royal College of Surgeons.

== Early life and education ==
Parks attended Sutton High School and later Epsom College (1935–1940) on a scholarship. He became president of the Oxford University Athletic Club while playing rugby during his bachelors studies. He graduated from Brasenose College, Oxford in 1943 after four years of study. Parks then became one of few people chosen as a Rockefeller student at Johns Hopkins University for medical training. He graduated with his medical doctorate (MD) from Johns Hopkins in 1947 and returned to Guy's Hospital in London the same year.

== Career ==
At Guy's Hospital, Parks was a house physician and research assistant for two years. He then spent two years with the Royal Army Medical Corps (RAMC) as a surgeon with deployments in Asia including Japan and Korea. Upon returning to London, Parks became a resident surgical officer at Putney Hospital in London. He was next a registrar and then senior registrar at Guy's until 1959 when he was appointed as a consultant surgeon at St Mark's Hospital, the world's first bowel specialised hospital, in London. At the time, Parks was the first person to be appointed as a St Mark's surgical consultant without having also done his residency at the hospital.

Parks is credited with being the first surgeon in the world to premiere the ileo-anal pouch procedure in 1976. His first pouch surgery took place at the London Hospital (called the Royal London Hospital since 1990). Parks' pouch design was a S-shaped pouch. Afterwards, he continued to develop the procedure at St Mark's Hospital.

The aim of Parks' ileo-anal pouch was to improve quality of life after a person needed to have their colon and rectum removed because of disease by providing select people who were medically suitable the option to choose between having their anal evacuation route reconstructed or life with a permanent ileostomy. The ileo-anal pouch is known by a number of names including the Parks' pouch, S-pouch, W-pouch, J-pouch, restorative proctocolectomy (RPC), pelvic pouch, and ileo pouch-anal anastomosis (IPAA).

Parks' ileal-pouch anal anastomosis (IPAA) was an advancement in colorectal surgery building off both the ileum-anal anastomosis from the 1940s and the Koch pouch, or continent ileostomy first performed by Finnish surgeon Dr Nils Kock in Sweden during 1969. With the ileal pouch-anal anastomosis (IPAA), Parks' added the construction of a reservoir or 'pouch' made from 40-50 centimetres of the small bowel (ileum) immediately above the excised colon and rectum before performing the anastomosis between the ileal pouch and the anus. This not only restored anal evacuation but was intended to improve the patient's function by reducing the frequency of defaecation, as was reported to be high from the ileum-anal anastomosis (without pouch) as described by Ravich and Sabiston in 1947.

The first article published on ileo-anal pouch surgery was authored by Parks and his colleague, John Nicholls, who also contributed to the development of the pouch procedure, in the British Medical Journal in 1978. The first five people with pouches, all S-pouches, were included in the study.

Parks is also known for a number of other contributions to colorectal surgery including his 1954 description of haemorrhoid treatment explaining a new submucous procedure which was dubbed "Parks' painless proctoplasty". His research into the treatment of anal incontinence and fistula-in-ano also had a lasting impact on the practice of colorectal surgery.

Parks was elected president of the Royal College of Surgeons in 1980. The same year he was awarded the Ernst Jung Prize for Medicine.

== Death ==
Sir Alan Parks died in London on 3 November 1982 at St Bartholomew's Hospital after emergency cardiac surgery while he was in office as president of the Royal College of Surgeons. He had previously suffered a heart attack while in Rome during October 1982.

== See also ==
- De Simone Formulation

Academic offices
Preceded by Sir Reginald Murley	President of the Royal College of Surgeons of England; 1980–1982	Succeeded by Geoffrey Slaney
