= Pouchoscopy =

- Purpose: Exam ileo-anal pouch

Pouchoscopy is a minimally invasive endoscopic procedure to examine an ileo-anal pouch, a replacement for the colon / rectum which is surgically created from the small intestine (ileum) as treatment for ulcerative colitis, a preventive measure in certain genetic illnesses such as FAP or HNPCC or as a procedure in the treatment of colon cancer. Typically, a fiber optic camera on a flexible tube is passed through the anus. Pouchoscopy is the first line test to evaluate pouch dysfunction, and is used for surveillance in individuals with genetic cancer syndromes (FAP). While pouchoscopy may help assess the integrity of the J-pouch (hence the name pouchoscopy), this evaluation is more commonly completed using a pouchogram (a necessary step in preparing for reversal of the temporary ileostomy, or takedown surgery). A pouchoscopy is normally part of a routine follow up and is used to confirm the diagnosis of pouchitis and cuffitis.

== See also ==
- Colonoscopy
