= List of Danish inventions and discoveries =

This topic describes the inventions and discoveries of people of danish origin

This is a list of Danish inventions and discoveries. The following incomplete list comprises people from Danish and of Danish origin. The following is a list of inventions or discoveries generally believed to be Danish:

== Arts ==
- Lego — a line of plastic construction toys manufactured by the Lego Group, a privately held company based in Billund, Denmark. It was founded by Ole Kirk Christiansen, a carpenter from Billund, Denmark, who began making wooden toys in 1932. By 1930, Christiansen employed a small workforce to maintain his growing business.

== Astronomy ==
- Tychonic system — a model of the universe published by Tycho Brahe in 1588, which describes the Earth as the centre of the universe, with the planets revolving around the Sun, which in turn revolves around the Earth.

== Biology ==
- Gram stain — a method of staining used to classify bacteria species which was developed by Danish bacteriologist Hans Christian Gram .
- Parotid duct — first described by Nicolas Steno.

== Chemistry ==
- pH- The pH scale was invented in 1909 by Danish chemist Søren Peter Lauritz Sørensen at the Carlsberg Laboratory. He developed it as a convenient method for measuring the acidity or basicity of substances.
- Hafnium – discovered by Dirk Coster and George de Hevesy in Copenhagen, 1923.

== Physics ==
=== Natural physics ===
- Speed of light — Ole Christensen Rømer was a Danish astronomer, first demonstrated that light travels at a finite speed.

=== Electrical physics ===
- Magnetic field — the concept that electric current creates a magnetic field was proposed by Hans Christian Ørsted.

=== Quantum physics ===
- Bohr model — developed by Niels Bohr.
- Bohr–Van Leeuwen theorem — proposed by Niels Bohr, it states that when statistical mechanics and classical mechanics are applied consistently, the thermal average of the magnetization is always zero.

== Technology ==
- Thermometer — The modern thermometer, showing the temperature between two fixed points, was invented by Ole Rømer.

=== Computer Science ===
- C++ — a high-level, programming language created by Danish computer scientist Bjarne Stroustrup.

=== Medical ===
- Ostomy bag — The modern ostomy bag was designed by the Danish nurse Elise Sørensen.
