= Cuffitis =

- Different regions of Ileal pouch-anal anastomosis
- Specialty: General surgery

Cuffitis is inflammation at the anal transition zone or "cuff" created as a result of ileal pouch-anal anastomosis (IPAA). It is considered a variant form of ulcerative colitis that occurs in the rectal cuff. Cuffitis is a common complication of IPAA, particularly when a stapled anastomosis without mucosectomy procedure has been used.

== Signs and symptoms ==
Symptoms of cuffitis mimic those of pouchitis. In addition, patients with cuffitis often present with small volume bloody bowel movements. Often, cuffitis can produce the appearance of bright red blood on tissue.

=== Complications ===
Surgery-associated ischemia may contribute inflammation at the anal transitional zone.

Patients whose cuffitis is refractory to mesalamine and/or corticosteroids should be evaluated for other disease in the cuff area, such as fistula or anastomotic leaks. Cuffitis that is refractory to medication can also be a sign of Crohn's disease of the pouch.

Chronic cuffitis can also contribute to the development of anastomotic stricture.

Cuffitis that is refractory, Crohn's-related, or is associated with surgical complications can contribute to pouch failure.

== Diagnosis ==
Definitive diagnose of cuffitis is obtained by endoscopy.

== Treatment ==
Cuffitis is treated with mesalamine suppositories or topical application of lidocaine or corticosteroid medications. Systemic medications are rarely used.
