= Pouchitis =

- Specialty: General surgery, Gastroenterology
- Diagnostic method: Pouchoscopy
- Frequency: 0.03%

Pouchitis is an umbrella term for inflammation of the ileal pouch, an artificial rectum surgically created out of ileum (the last section of the small intestine) in patients who have undergone a proctocolectomy or total colectomy (removal of the colon and rectum). The ileal pouch-anal anastomosis is created in the management of patients with ulcerative colitis, indeterminate colitis, familial adenomatous polyposis, cancer, or rarely, other colitides.

A variety of mechanisms can be the cause of pouchitis including inflammatory factors such as a dysbiosis sparked inflammation or Crohn's disease of the pouch, surgical causes including surgical join leaks and pelvic sepsis, or infectious from Clostridioides difficile (C Diff) or Cytomegalovirus (CMV). It is possible to have more than one factor causing pouch inflammation at the same time.

The incidence of a first episode of pouchitis at 1, 5 and 10 years post-operatively is 15%, 33%, and 45% respectively.

Patients with pouchitis typically present with bloody diarrhea, urgency in passing stools, or discomfort while passing stools. The loss of blood and/or dehydration resulting from the frequent stools will frequently result in nausea. Extreme cramping and pain can occur with pouchitis.

Endoscopic evaluation of the pouch (pouchoscopy) in patients with pouchitis usually reveals erythematous pouch mucosa, loss of pseudocolonic vasculature or other architecture, and friability of the mucosa. Biopsies show evidence of inflammatory cells or red blood cells in the lamina propria.

== Signs and symptoms ==
Symptoms of pouchitis include increased stool frequency, urgency, incontinence, nocturnal seepage, abdominal cramping, pelvic discomfort, and arthralgia.

Symptom severity does not always correlate with severity of endoscopically or histologically evaluated pouch inflammation. Additionally, these symptoms are not necessarily specific for pouchitis, as they may arise from other inflammatory or functional pouch disorders such as Crohn's disease of the pouch, cuffitis, pouch sinus, or irritable pouch syndrome. The most reliable tool for diagnosis is endoscopy combined with histologic features (derived from tissue biopsies obtained during endoscopy).

== Diagnosis ==
=== Classification ===
Once a diagnosis of pouchitis is made, the condition is further classified. The activity of pouchitis is stratified as:

- Remission (no active pouchitis)
- Mild to moderately active (increased stool frequency, urgency, infrequent incontinence)
- Severely active (hospitalised for dehydration, frequent incontinence)

The duration of pouchitis is defined as acute (less than or equal to four weeks) or chronic (four weeks or more) and the pattern classified as infrequent (1–2 acute episodes), relapsing (three or fewer episodes) or continuous. Finally, the response to medical treatment as labelled as treatment responsive or treatment refractory, with the medication for either case being specified.

== Treatment ==
First line treatment is usually with antibiotics, specifically with ciprofloxacin and metronidazole. Ampicillin or piperacillin can also be considered as alternatives to empiric ciprofloxacin and metronidazole. Administration of metronidazole at a high daily dose of 20 mg/kg can cause symptomatic peripheral neuropathology in up to 85% of patients. This can be a limiting factor in the use of maintenance metronidazole to suppress chronic pouchitis.

Other therapies which have been shown to be effective includes probiotics for pouchitis, the application of which usually begins as soon as any antibiotic course is completed so as to re-populate the pouch with beneficial bacteria.

Biologics, such as anti-tumor necrosis factor antibodies, may also be useful but the evidence for their use is largely anecdotal.

== Research ==
A pilot study on the effect of reducing dietary FODMAP intake on bowel function in people without a colon indicates there might be a relation between pouchitis and FODMAP diets.

Alicaforsen (an antisense inhibitor which targets the messenger RNA for the production of human ICAM-1 protein) was evaluated in a Phase 3 clinical trial, which did not meet the co-primary endpoints in the primary analysis (an adaptation of the Mayo Score of improvement in endoscopic remission and bowel frequency).
