= Victor Fazio =

Victor Fazio may refer to:

- Victor H. Fazio (1942–2022), former Democratic congressman from California
- Victor Warren Fazio (1940–2015), Australian surgeon
