= Gunnar Wikholm =

Swedish neuroradiologist

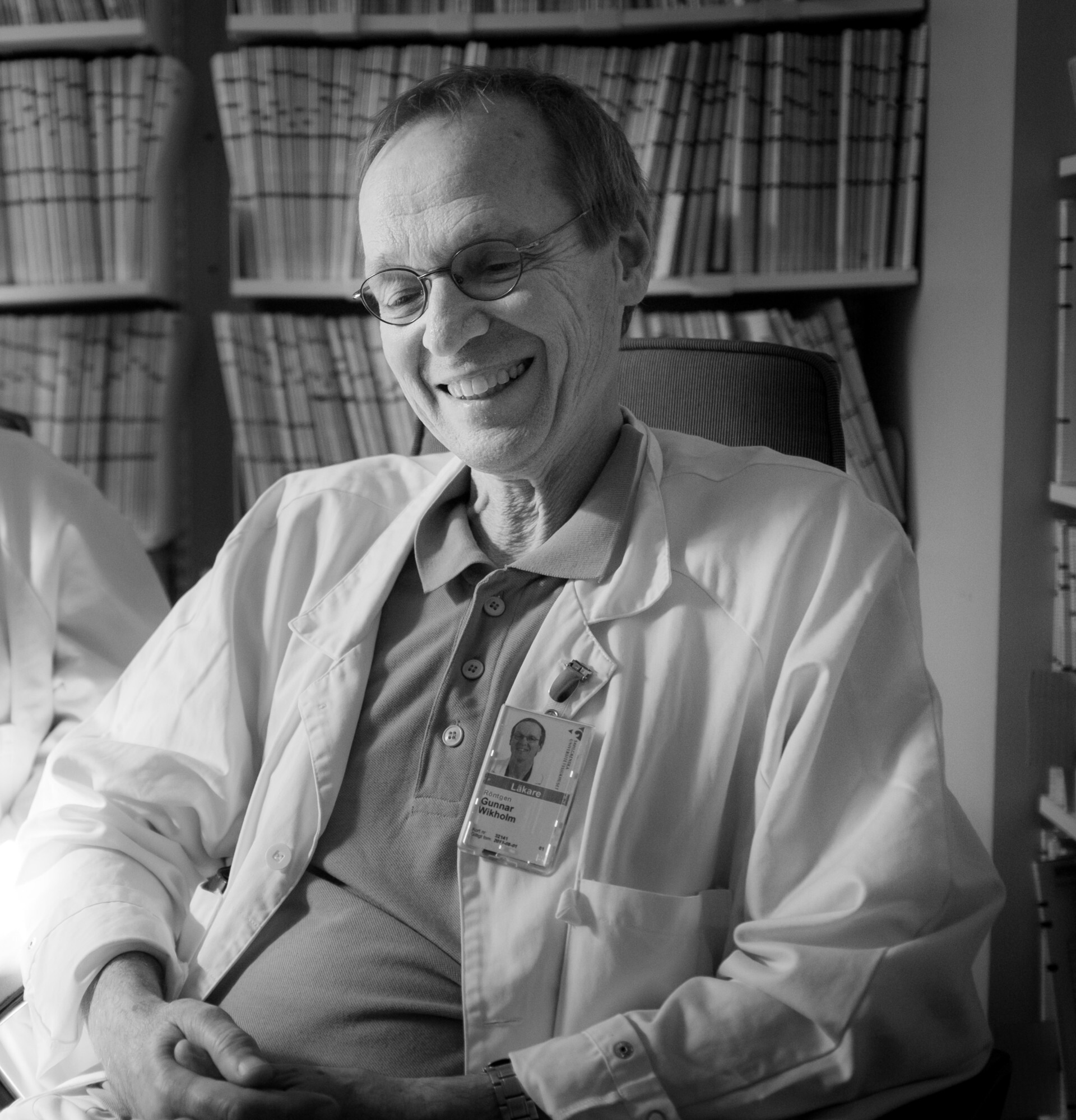
- Born: Örebro, Sweden
- Died: December 2025 (aged 77)
- Occupation: Interventional neuroradiologist
- Employer: Sahlgrenska University Hospital

Gunnar Wikholm (1948-2025) was a Swedish physician and interventional neuroradiologist who worked at Sahlgrenska University Hospital in Gothenburg, Sweden. He was a pioneer in catheter-based mechanical removal of intracranial blood clots. He is known for doing the first documented embolectomy in the brain. Specifically, he is credited for using Amplatz GooseNeck snare for removal of a blood clot in the brain in 1994.

== Early life and education ==
Wikholm was born and raised in Örebro. He began his medical studies in Lund and continued them in Gothenburg. He completed an internship in Nyköping and trained in radiology. In 1995, he received a PhD in diagnostic radiology; his thesis concerned the role of transarterial embolization in the management of cerebral arteriovenous malformations.

== Career ==
Early in his career, Wikholm joined the interventional unit at Sahlgrenska University Hospital, which was established in the 1980s by neuroradiologist Pål Svendsen and was the first neurointerventional unit in the Nordic countries. The unit collaborated with internationally leading centers, including those in Boston and Paris, and treated vascular malformations of the brain and spinal cord using embolization, often in combination with neurosurgery and/or targeted radiation therapy.

In 1994, while Wikholm was doing endovascular coiling for a ruptured intracranial aneurysm, an artery that had been open before the procedure became occluded by a clot; under time pressure, he chose to use a catheter-delivered micro-snare (normally used to retrieve dislodged coils) to remove the clot and reopen the artery. He was the first in the world to do so.

== Legacy ==
The University of Gothenburg obituary described Wikholm as a skilled clinician and collaborator who passed on knowledge and techniques to the contemporary neurointerventional unit at Sahlgrenska, which it characterized as operating at a high international standard.

== Death ==
Wikholm died in December 2025 after a period of illness, at the age of 77.
