= Agneta Holmäng =

Swedish physician and physiology professor

Agneta Holmäng is a Swedish physician and professor of physiology at the University of Gothenburg, where she led the Sahlgrenska Academy as its dean from 2018 to 2023. Her research group studies how diet, obesity and gestational diabetes affect the health of mothers and their children. In 2024 she was elected chair of the Swedish Society for Medical Research, the first woman to hold that post.

== Career ==
Holmäng trained as a physician and holds a professorship at the University of Gothenburg, where she works at the Department of Physiology within the Institute of Neuroscience and Physiology. From 2006 she served as head of the Department of Neuroscience and Physiology.

In November 2017 she was elected dean of the Sahlgrenska Academy, the faculty of medicine and health sciences at the University of Gothenburg, for the term 2018 to 2023. When she took office she said her priorities included staff planning and clearer career paths, so the academy would keep both its teaching and its research expertise. She was succeeded as dean by Jenny Nyström, whose term began in 2024.

Alongside her university roles Holmäng has sat on several national research bodies. She chaired the scientific council for medicine of the Swedish Research Council for Sport Science from 2006 to 2014, and she joined the board of the Swedish Society for Medical Research (Svenska Sällskapet för Medicinsk Forskning, SSMF) in 2015, where she also chaired its grant review committee. On 24 May 2024 the society, founded in 1919, elected her as its chair, making her the first woman to lead it.

== Research ==
Holmäng works on the metabolic effects of obesity and gestational diabetes, combining clinical and experimental methods. She leads the PONCH study (Pregnancy Obesity Nutrition Child Health), a prospective longitudinal project that follows women through and after pregnancy to see how diet, body weight and gestational diabetes affect the metabolic health of both mother and child.
