= Alicaforsen =

Chemical compound

Clinical data
- Trade names: Camligo
- Other names: DNA, d[(R)-P-thio](G-C-C-C-A-A-G-C-T-G-G-C-A-T-C-C-G-T-C-A)

Identifiers
- IUPAC name: all-P-ambo-2'-deoxy-P-thioguanylyl-(3'→5')-2'-deoxy-P-thiocytidylyl-(3'→5')-2'-deoxy-P-thiocytidylyl-(3'→5')-2'-deoxy-P-thiocytidylyl-(3'→5')-2'-deoxy-P-thioadenylyl-(3'→5')-2'-deoxy-P-thioadenylyl-(3'→5')-2'-deoxy-P-thioguanylyl-(3'→5')-2'-deoxy-P-thiocytidylyl-(3'→5')-P-thiothymidylyl-(3'→5')-2'-deoxy-P-thioguanylyl-(3'→5')-2'-deoxy-P-thioguanylyl-(3'→5')-2'-deoxy-P-thiocytidylyl-(3'→5')-2'-deoxy-P-thioadenylyl-(3'→5')-P-thiothymidylyl-(3'→5')-2'-deoxy-P-thiocytidylyl-(3'→5')-2'-deoxy-P-thiocytidylyl-(3'→5')-2'-deoxy-P-thioguanylyl-(3'→5')-P-thiothymidylyl-(3'→5')-2'-deoxy-P-thiocytidylyl-(3'→5')-2'-deoxyadenosine
- CAS Number: 185229-68-9
- PubChem CID: 16197724
- ChemSpider: 17326145
- UNII: J8435V445B
- ChEMBL: ChEMBL2108326

Chemical and physical data
- Formula: C_{192}H_{244}N_{75}O_{98}P_{19}S_{19}
- Molar mass: 6368.13 g·mol^{−1}
- SMILES: Cc1cn(c(=O)[nH]c1=O)[C@H]2C[C@@H]([C@H](O2)COP(=S)(O)O[C@H]3C[C@@H](O[C@@H]3COP(=S)(O)O[C@H]4C[C@@H](O[C@@H]4COP(=S)(O)O[C@H]5C[C@@H](O[C@@H]5COP(=S)(O)O[C@H]6C[C@@H](O[C@@H]6COP(=S)(O)O[C@H]7C[C@@H](O[C@@H]7COP(=S)(O)O[C@H]8C[C@@H](O[C@@H]8COP(=S)(O)O[C@H]9C[C@@H](O[C@@H]9COP(=S)(O)O[C@H]1C[C@@H](O[C@@H]1CO)n1cnc2c1nc([nH]c2=O)N)n1ccc(nc1=O)N)n1ccc(nc1=O)N)n1ccc(nc1=O)N)n1cnc2c1ncnc2N)n1cnc2c1ncnc2N)n1cnc2c1nc([nH]c2=O)N)n1ccc(nc1=O)N)OP(=S)(O)OC[C@@H]1[C@H](C[C@@H](O1)n1cnc2c1nc([nH]c2=O)N)OP(=S)(O)OC[C@@H]1[C@H](C[C@@H](O1)n1cnc2c1nc([nH]c2=O)N)OP(=S)(O)OC[C@@H]1[C@H](C[C@@H](O1)n1ccc(nc1=O)N)OP(=S)(O)OC[C@@H]1[C@H](C[C@@H](O1)n1cnc2c1ncnc2N)OP(=S)(O)OC[C@@H]1[C@H](C[C@@H](O1)n1cc(c(=O)[nH]c1=O)C)OP(=S)(O)OC[C@@H]1[C@H](C[C@@H](O1)n1ccc(nc1=O)N)OP(=S)(O)OC[C@@H]1[C@H](C[C@@H](O1)n1ccc(nc1=O)N)OP(=S)(O)OC[C@@H]1[C@H](C[C@@H](O1)n1cnc2c1nc([nH]c2=O)N)OP(=S)(O)OC[C@@H]1[C@H](C[C@@H](O1)n1cc(c(=O)[nH]c1=O)C)OP(=S)(O)OC[C@@H]1[C@H](C[C@@H](O1)n1ccc(nc1=O)N)OP(=S)(O)OC[C@@H]1[C@H](C[C@@H](O1)n1cnc2c1ncnc2N)O
- InChI: InChI=InChI=1S/C192H244N75O98P19S19/c1-76-40-256(190(286)245-169(76)270)136-30-89(357-376(299,395)314-50-106-84(25-131(334-106)251-15-7-122(196)230-185(251)281)351-370(293,389)312-49-105-87(28-134(333-105)254-18-10-125(199)233-188(254)284)355-374(297,393)323-59-115-97(38-145(343-115)266-74-225-154-167(266)238-180(208)243-175(154)276)364-381(304,400)319-55-111-90(31-137(339-111)257-41-77(2)170(271)246-191(257)287)356-375(298,394)313-46-102-81(22-128(330-102)248-12-4-119(193)227-182(248)278)348-366(289,385)308-44-100-79(269)20-127(328-100)259-67-218-147-156(201)210-63-214-160(147)259)110(338-136)54-318-380(303,399)359-92-33-139(260-68-219-148-157(202)211-64-215-161(148)260)340-112(92)56-320-373(296,392)354-88-29-135(255-19-11-126(200)234-189(255)285)336-108(88)52-316-379(302,398)363-96-37-144(265-73-224-153-166(265)237-179(207)242-174(153)275)346-118(96)62-326-384(307,403)365-98-39-146(267-75-226-155-168(267)239-181(209)244-176(155)277)344-116(98)60-324-377(300,396)358-91-32-138(258-42-78(3)171(272)247-192(258)288)337-109(91)53-317-371(294,390)352-85-26-132(252-16-8-123(197)231-186(252)282)335-107(85)51-315-378(301,397)362-95-36-143(264-72-223-152-165(264)236-178(206)241-173(152)274)345-117(95)61-325-383(306,402)361-94-35-141(262-70-221-150-159(204)213-66-217-163(150)262)342-114(94)58-322-382(305,401)360-93-34-140(261-69-220-149-158(203)212-65-216-162(149)261)341-113(93)57-321-372(295,391)353-86-27-133(253-17-9-124(198)232-187(253)283)332-104(86)48-311-369(292,388)350-83-24-130(250-14-6-121(195)229-184(250)280)331-103(83)47-310-368(291,387)349-82-23-129(249-13-5-120(194)228-183(249)279)329-101(82)45-309-367(290,386)347-80-21-142(327-99(80)43-268)263-71-222-151-164(263)235-177(205)240-172(151)273/h4-19,40-42,63-75,79-118,127-146,268-269H,20-39,43-62H2,1-3H3,(H,289,385)(H,290,386)(H,291,387)(H,292,388)(H,293,389)(H,294,390)(H,295,391)(H,296,392)(H,297,393)(H,298,394)(H,299,395)(H,300,396)(H,301,397)(H,302,398)(H,303,399)(H,304,400)(H,305,401)(H,306,402)(H,307,403)(H2,193,227,278)(H2,194,228,279)(H2,195,229,280)(H2,196,230,281)(H2,197,231,282)(H2,198,232,283)(H2,199,233,284)(H2,200,234,285)(H2,201,210,214)(H2,202,211,215)(H2,203,212,216)(H2,204,213,217)(H,245,270,286)(H,246,271,287)(H,247,272,288)(H3,205,235,240,273)(H3,206,236,241,274)(H3,207,237,242,275)(H3,208,238,243,276)(H3,209,239,244,277)/t79-,80-,81-,82-,83-,84-,85-,86-,87-,88-,89-,90-,91-,92-,93-,94-,95-,96-,97-,98-,99+,100+,101+,102+,103+,104+,105+,106+,107+,108+,109+,110+,111+,112+,113+,114+,115+,116+,117+,118+,127+,128+,129+,130+,131+,132+,133+,134+,135+,136+,137+,138+,139+,140+,141+,142+,143+,144+,145+,146+,366?,367?,368?,369?,370?,371?,372?,373?,374?,375?,376?,377?,378?,379?,380?,381?,382?,383?,384?/m0/s1; Key:ZMJWRJKGPUDEOX-LMXUULCNSA-N

Alicaforsen (trade name Camligo) is an antisense oligonucleotide therapeutic that targets the messenger RNA for the production of human ICAM-1 receptor and is being developed for the treatment of acute disease flares in moderate to severe Inflammatory Bowel Disease (IBD).

Alicaforsen inhibits ICAM-1 production, which is an important adhesion molecule involved in leukocyte migration and trafficking to the site of inflammation. Hitherto, alicaforsen has been granted orphan drug designation and is prescribed as an unlicensed medicine in accordance with international regulation, for the treatment of pouchitis and left-sided ulcerative colitis. Given the positive results from an open-label trial and one case series in patients with chronic refractory pouchitis, US FDA has agreed to a rolling submission for a license application for the treatment of pouchitis.

It was discovered by Ionis Pharmaceuticals (formerly Isis Pharmaceuticals) and in 2017 Atlantic Healthcare plc took over the development for chronic antibiotic refractory pouchitis in an enema formulation.

== Pharmacology ==
ICAM-1 promotes the extravasation and activation of leukocytes (white blood cells), which is part of the inflammation process. Alicaforsen inhibits the activity of ICAM-1 protein by degrading mRNA coding for it via an RNase-H based mechanism.

It appears to have better efficacy as a topical medication than via systemic administration which is typical of antisense drugs.

== Clinical trials ==
In a Phase III randomised clinical trial with 299 patients with steroid dependent Crohn's disease, clinical response was correlated with drug exposure, with significant efficacy versus placebo being observed in the subgroup with greatest area under the curve, hence pharmacodynamic modelling suggests that alicaforsen (ISIS 2302) may be an effective therapy at adequate dose levels.

In another placebo-controlled study with 331 subjects with active Crohn's Disease, alicaforsen failed to demonstrate efficacy in any of its primary outcome measures. However there was a suggestion of a therapeutic response in a sub-population with elevated serum CRP (C-reactive Protein) levels >2mg/dl. The differential response highlights the confounding symptoms of a large subset of subjects whose needs are apparently not being met by the current clinical trial design. There is a need for more specific biomarkers that clearly can identify disease severity and subtypes of Crohn's disease and can be used to monitor disease response objectively.

== Chemistry ==
Alicaforsen is a 20 unit phosphorothioate modified antisense oligonucleotide and has the sequence:

- 5'-GCC CAA GCT GGC ATC CGT CA-3'

== History ==
Alicaforsen was discovered and initially developed by Isis Pharmaceuticals, which changed its name to Ionis Pharmaceuticals in 2015.

Isis partnered on development of alicaforsen with Boehringer Ingelheim starting in 1995; that deal ended in 1999, after each of IV and subcutaneously delivered alicaforsen failed in phase III trials for Crohn's disease and development of those formulations in that indication was terminated; development for rheumatoid arthritis was terminated the same year and development in kidney transplant apparently ceased as well at that time.

The company reformulated alicaforsen as an enema and three small trials were published between 2004 and 2006, an open label trial in chronic pouchitis and two randomized trials in ulcerative colitis (UC); in the UC trials the drug missed its primary endpoint of improvements at 6 weeks, but showed a better effect in the longer term (between 18 and 30 weeks).

A post hoc meta-analysis of individual data of 200 patients from four phase 2 studies evaluating nightly alicaforsen 240 mg enema for six weeks showed that alicaforsen is effective in patients with active, distal, moderate to severe UC. The efficacy of alicaforsen was durable in these sub-groups, with significantly improved duration of clinical response with no maintenance therapy, suggesting a disease-modifying effect. This analysis suggests that alicaforsen enema could offer an effective, potentially durable response in moderate/severe distal active UC.

Alicaforsen was licensed to Atlantic Healthcare in 2007.

The use of the enema formulation of alicaforsen to treat pouchitis was granted orphan drug status in the US in 2008 and received the same in Europe in 2009. The enema formulation of alicaforsen for pouchitis received FDA Fast Track designation. In a subsequent multicentre Phase 3 clinical trial in 138 subjects with Active, Chronic, Antibiotic Refractory Primary Idiopathic Pouchitis, showed a clinically relevant 34% remission in stool frequency with 8% delta vs placebo. However the co-primary endpoints (an adaptation of the Mayo Score of improvement in endoscopic remission and bowel frequency) were not met, perhaps due to the high discontinuation rate of 35% that compromised the sample size available for statistical analysis. Disallowing background maintenance therapies contributed to this high dropout rate in this challenging, heterogenous patient group. Further the appropriateness of endoscopy as a primary end point is questionable.

Atlantic Healthcare has supplied over 350 courses of alicaforsen enema treatment on a named patient / compassionate use programme. Clinical outcomes published in case series have confirmed durable disease remission in patients with Ulcerative Colitis with no treatment related SAEs.

• UC case series publications confirming prolonged duration of action:

Ø Digestive Diseases Journal (Nov 2017); 10/12 patients with left-sided UC/proctitis responded to treatment, with a median durable response of 18 weeks

Ø Gastrodagarna Congress, Sweden (May 2016); all 7 distal UC patients that completed treatment responded, 57% remained in remission for 5-20 months

Ø Irish Society of Gastroenterology (Nov 2014); reported remission achieved in 57% of patients with UC with a durable response ^{1}

No drug-related SAEs have been reported in any usage of alicaforsen enema
