= Katharina Sunnerhagen =

Swedish physician

Katharina Stibrant Sunnerhagen is a Swedish physician, researcher and educator specialized in rehabilitation medicine. She is best known for her research in stroke rehabilitation. She is currently the Professor and Head of Rehabilitation Medicine Research Group at University of Gothenburg.

== Career ==
Sunnerhagen graduated from the University of Gothenburg with a degree in medicine. She underwent specialist training in rehabilitation medicine. She was awarded a doctor of philosophy degree for her PhD thesis titled Regional Wall Motion in the Left Ventricle. Sunnerhagen was involved in drafting recommendations for stroke rehabilitation in Europe at World Stroke Congresses in 2010 and 2012. She is a member of scientific councils in stroke organizations including the Stroke Victims Association, the Handlaren Hjalmar Svenssons Foundation and the Greta and Einar Askers Foundation. She is a board member of the Journal of Rehabilitation Medicine (since 2003), Acta Neurologica (since 2009) and Rehabilitation Research & Practice (2010). Presently, she is working as a consultant at Sahlgrenska University Hospital and as a guest professor at Sunnaas Rehbilitation Hospital, Norway. She was elected as a member of the board of directors at the European Stroke Organization in 2016. She has published over 200 peer-reviewed original articles and several chapters in textbooks.
