= Ileo-anal pouch =

Surgically created intestinal reservoir that restores anal evacuation

In medicine, the ileal pouch–anal anastomosis (IPAA), also known as restorative proctocolectomy (RPC), ileal-anal reservoir (IAR), an ileo-anal pouch, ileal-anal pullthrough, or sometimes referred to as a J-pouch, S-pouch, W-pouch, or a pelvic pouch, is an anastomosis of a reservoir pouch made from ileum (small intestine) to the anus, bypassing the former site of the colon in cases where the colon and rectum have been removed. The pouch retains and restores functionality of the anus, with stools passed under voluntary control of the person, preventing fecal incontinence and serving as an alternative to a total proctocolectomy with ileostomy.

During a total proctocolectomy, a surgeon removes a person's diseased colon, rectum, and anus. For the ileostomy, the end of the small intestine is brought to the surface of the body through an opening in the abdominal wall for waste to be removed. People with ileostomies wear an external bag, also known as an ostomy system or stoma appliance, to collect waste which can be emptied and changed as needed.

With an optional ileo-anal pouch procedure, the pouch component is a surgically constructed internal intestinal reservoir; usually situated near where the rectum would normally be. It is formed by folding loops of small intestine (the ileum) back on themselves and stitching or stapling them together. The internal walls are then removed thus forming a reservoir often referred to as a 'pouch'. The reservoir is then stitched or stapled into anal area where the bottom of the rectum was. The first pouch anal-anastomosis surgery in the world was performed by British surgeon Sir Alan Parks in 1976 at the London Hospital (called the Royal London Hospital since 1990). After the first surgery, he continued to develop the procedure at St Mark's Hospital in London along with his colleague John Nicholls.

Pouch surgery is elective, meaning it is entirely optional, and should be done on the basis of choice by people who doctors deem suitable for a pouch after medical evaluations. Pouch surgery is considered reconstructive with the benefit being for quality of life and not disease removal, similar in theory to a breast reconstruction after a mastectomy removes diseased breast tissue. Before a pouch is created, a person's diseased colon and rectum are removed. After disease removal, standard medical screening exams for pouch candidates include but are not limited to biopsies, radiology imaging, sphincter function tests, fertility consultations for people of childbearing age with the wish to get pregnant, and psychological support due to intensity of the pouch operations.

A similar ileal pouch without the anal anastomosis is a Kock pouch. A Kock pouch is also called a 'continent ileostomy' because while a person has a pouch constructed inside their body, it is located near the abdominal wall and empties via a stoma from the ileum at the person's convenience. A Kock pouch does not restore the anal function. The procedure was first premiered by Finnish surgeon Nils Kock in Sweden during 1969. It was an evolution in bowel surgery because it created an ileum pouch for storage of waste inside the body eliminating the need for an external bag for waste collection. An ileostomy without a Kock pouch functions constantly, meaning, a patient with ileostomy by itself is incontinent because waste is always moving down the bowel and thus the need for an external appliance bag. Kock pouch surgery is also elective surgery that only provides a reconstructive benefit after disease removal. It should be the patient's optional choice based on how a person wants to live their life.

== Reasons for ileal-pouch anal anastomosis (IPAA) surgery ==
Ileo-anal pouches are constructed for people who have had their colon and rectum surgically removed due to disease, injury, or infection. Several diseases and conditions may trigger the need for surgical removal.

=== Disease, injury, or infection ===
- Ulcerative colitis (UC)
- Crohn's disease (in select cases)
- Familial adenomatous polyposis (FAP)
- Colon cancer
- Toxic megacolon

There is debate about whether patients with Crohn's disease and indeterminate colitis are suitable candidates for an ileo-anal pouch due to the risk of the disease occurring in the pouch. Crohn's disease can manifest in many different parts of the digestive tract, so the removal of the colon and creation of a pouch, while alleviating symptoms that occurred in the large intestine plus possibly the rectum, does not eliminate Crohn's disease.

=== Contradictions to pouch surgery ===
Additional contradictions that may prevent a person from being able to undergo pouch surgery include but are not limited to weak sphincter muscles, advanced age (elderly) due to the higher risk of fecal incontinence, pelvic radiation therapy, and women with a history of obstetric complications.

=== Pouch surgery is not curative but restorative ===
Ileum pouch surgery (Kock and IPAA) are reconstructive procedures. Reconstructive procedures do not cure disease. Since they are not curative, reconstructive surgeries are not medically necessary, meaning they are elective operations. Several words can be used to describe an 'elective surgery' including optional and patient's choice. Pouch reconstruction should never be offered as the only option to a person because it is elective and should be a voluntary choice offered alongside other options that are safe for the person's individual circumstances.

While both ulcerative colitis (UC) and familial adenomatous polyposis (FAP) patients and are sometimes controversially considered cured of problematic symptoms after pouch creation due to the removal of disease activity in the colon and rectum, there are still many complications that can arise. While life with a pouch is typically viewed by some people plus some medical professionals as a significant improvement compared to life with an ileostomy, patients living with a pouch may still face daily pains and discomforts including the inability to sleep through the night, a changed diet, severe or frequent gas pain, nutrient deficiencies, and the inability to digest certain foods.

With regards to ulcerative colitis (UC), the disease is a systemic immune mediated inflammatory disease, also often referred to as an autoimmune condition. The main risk UC presents is typically inflammation that causes ulcers in the lining of the colon and rectum. This common expression happens in the mucosal layer of the intestine that is only present in the colon and rectum (not the small intestine), which is why the disease was named 'ulcerative colitis'. Therefore, ulcerative colitis is considered 'cured' of the problematic disease activity in the colon and rectum only, after both the large intestine and rectum are removed. Reasons to remove this mucosal layer include severe discomfort that reduces quality of life, bowel perforation from inflammation, and development of tumors that are cancerous from long-term inflammation.

Even after a person has their colon and rectum removed, the circumstances that created ulcerative colitis still lives on inside that person's body because it is a systemic immune mediated condition. These conditions occasionally manifest in other ways including additional illnesses considered related to ulcerative colitis like primary sclerosing cholangitis (PSC) in the liver, the eye condition uveitis, and certain forms of arthritis throughout the body.

It is important to understand that pouch surgery does not cure a patient of ulcerative colitis, removal of the diseased mucosal layer in the colon and rectum cures the disease in the colon and rectum only, if the entire colon and full rectum are removed. For example, if a rectal remnant remains, UC disease can be retained in the small remnant. Active disease feels similar to ulcerative proctosis when the full natural rectum was in place. It is also medically treated the same way ulcerative proctosis was before any surgery. Even if the entire colon and rectum are removed to stop disease activity in this area, the underlying reasons for the expression of the disease in the large bowel and rectum's mucosal layer remain with the person.

=== Alternatives to IPAA pouch surgery ===
A pouch should never be offered as the only treatment option due to the fact it is reconstructive and not curative. People who need to have their colon and rectum removed are usually presented with several options including total proctocolectomy with end ileostomy ("Barbie" or "Ken" butt), colectomy with rectum left in place, pelvic pouch (ileo-anal pouch / IPAA), ileo-rectum anastomosis (IRA), or continent ileostomy such as a Kock pouch, for example, if someone has weak sphincter muscles or a diseased anus. The end decision should always be the patient's choice, based on if their health permits the option to have a good outcome.

Pouch surgery comes with a number of well known complications that a person will not be able to imagine as possibilities themselves, therefore, as part of the education and informed consent process before pouch creation surgery is scheduled, risks, complications, and safe alternatives need to be communicated. If a person has indeterminate colitis, they should also be informed before a pouch is recommended and created that their pathology is unknown due to the even higher risk indeterminate folks face.

=== Most common complication is pouch inflammation ===
The most common complication of pouch surgery is an umbrella term called pouchitis that encompasses many causes of inflammation of the pouch. The word 'pouchitis' simply means 'pouch inflammation' similar to 'tonsillitis' meaning 'tonsil inflammation' or 'sinusitis' meaning 'sinus inflammation'. While ulcerative colitis pouch patients may experience a dysbiosis sparked type of inflammation more than people who get a pouch because of cancer or FAP, pouchitis can be caused by a number of factors in any pouch. Pouchitis is grouped into four main categories of origin: inflammatory, mechanical, surgical, or functional. Pouchitis, meaning pouch inflammation from various root causes, can be a driver of pouch dysfunction for some.

== History ==
The surgical procedure for forming an ileal pouch-anal anastomosis (IPAA) was pioneered by Sir Alan Parks at the London Hospital, today called the Royal London Hospital, in 1976.

=== Parks' S-Pouch premieres as first anal-pouch reconstruction ===
Parks' pouch surgery was originally envisioned as a quality of life enhancing procedure for people who needed to have their colon and rectum removed. People who opted to have the procedure would be able to avoid an ileostomy by restoring intestinal continuity with elective, or optional, ileo-anal pouch surgery. Shortly after performing the world's first few pouch procedures in 1976, Sir Alan along with John Nicholls joined St Mark's Hospital also in London where they continued to develop the intestinal pouch procedure. The pair first published details of the procedure in the British Medical Journal in 1978 with the article "Proctocolectomy without ileostomy for ulcerative colitis".

Sir Alan Parks' ileo pouch-anal anastomosis (IPAA), was a surgical advancement from the ileoanal anastomosis procedure developed in the 1940s. With an ileum-anal anastomosis, the entire colon and rectum were removed. Next a surgical join (anastomosis) was used to connect the end of the small intestine (ileum) to the anus. It was described by the German surgeon Nissen in 1934 and American surgeons Ravitch and Sabiston in 1947. The ileum-anal anastomisis was reported to have a high of frequency of liquid movements making it uncomfortable for many people. It was also a surgical advancement from the Kock pouch first performed in Sweden by Finnish surgeon Nils Kock in 1969 because Parks' ileum pouch-anal anastomosis (IPAA), unlike Kock's 'continent ileostomy' allowed for restoration of anal evacuation.

The original Sir Alan S-pouches had a bit of intestine at the bottom of the design that often made them difficult to evacuate. Some patients later underwent advancement surgery to remove the extra tip of small intestine and lower the pouch directly onto the anus to remedy evacuation difficulties.

=== Invention of the J-pouch ===
In 1980, surgeons in Japan published the first study on the J-shaped pouch. J. Utunomiya is created with its creation. The J-shaped pouch design eliminated the 'conduit' or bit of intestine at the bottom of Sir Alan Parks' S-pouch formation making it easier for people to empty a J-pouch. As intestinal pouch surgery became more common, the J-pouch eventually became the dominant shape. J-pouches are easier for surgeons to construct than the hand sewn S or W formations because the Js are from two loops of ileum plus with the invention of the stapler, Js could be stapled, instead of hand-sewn. J-pouches are considered faster and easier to make over Ss and Ws.

=== Invention of the W-pouch ===
The same year as Sir Alan Parks' unexpected death in 1982, his St Mark's Hospital colleague, John Nicholls premiered the W-pouch which was an augmentation of the J-pouch made to expand the pouch's capacity and reduce the person's frequency of bowel movements. Nicholls' W-pouch is explained as two J-pouches placed together to make the higher capacity W-pouch.

The W-pouch was entirely hand-sewn and required a very experienced and highly skilled surgeon plus more time in the operating room. A J-pouch was not as technical and therefore, more surgeons could perform the procedure.

=== Adaptation of IPAA surgery in the United States ===
In the United States, Australian born colorectal surgeon Victor Warren Fazio was a driving force behind the procedure's adaptation into American colorectal surgery offerings. He established the Cleveland Clinic's prestigious pouch practice in 1983 when the clinic performed its first pouch surgery. In 2002 the Cleveland Clinic opened the world's first pouch center with its "Ileal Pouch Center".

About the same time as the Cleveland Clinic began offering the restorative proctocolectomy procedure (RPC), surgeons at the Mayo Clinic in Minnesota also started offering it to suitable patients including Roger R. Dozois who published several early studies on the pouch operation in the United States.

=== Global diffusion of IPAA ===
By the early 1980s, the ileal pouch procedure had become part of specialist colorectal surgical practices not just in the United Kingdom and United States but worldwide. Following the unexpected death of Sir Alan Parks in 1982, his colleague John Nicholls along with the pouch surgery team at St Marks Hospital collaborated with a number of leading hospitals globally to share pouch surgery knowledge Zane Cohen is credited with being a leader in Canada's development of pouch surgery. Rolland Parc was a force behind its early evolution in France. Gilberto Poggioli is credited with being at the forefront of establishing the pouch a surgical offering in Italy.

== Specialized pouch centers ==
It is generally considered best practice to create and manage ileum pouches at a facility that has specialized and experienced clinicians specifically for intestinal pouch care. Individual doctors and facilities can communicate their level of pouch experience to potential pouchees, people already living with a pouch interested in continued care, or loved ones who care for a person eligible for pouch construction surgery, or for loved ones already with a pouch. Colorectal, coloproctology, and/or proctology surgeons should be able to communicate their pouch surgery success and failure rates. Gastroenterologists and surgeons should also be able to refer people to pouch specialists for a second opinion on an existing recommendation or for continued pouch care.

=== Gastroenterology guidelines ===
Intestinal pouches are considered optional reconstructive procedures to be done by the patient's choice since pouch surgery itself does not cure disease. Pouch surgery can only take place after disease is removed. Many national gastroenterology associations including the British Society of Gastroenterology (BSG) and the European Crohn's and Colitis Organisation (ECCO) recommend that pouches should ideally be created at facilities that have specialized pouch centers when possible due to the high level of technical skill required for multidisciplinary management of a pouch. Numerous studies also show that there is a direct relation between the success of a pouch and the experience a surgeon has with previous pouch creations.

=== Specialized staffing at pouch centers ===
In addition to specialized doctors for colorectal surgery, gastroenterology, pathology, radiology, gynecology and urology, fertility, psychology, nutrition, and rehabilitation including physiotherapy, facilities with pouch centers often also have a specialized pouch nurse or pouch nursing team. The pouch nurse is usually an extension of the IBD nursing team or stoma nurse team. However, pouch nurses are also trained for pouches created from injury, infection, FAP, cancer and other reasons. Pouch nurses provide healthcare, advice, and support specific to the concerns of pouch patients before and after surgery.

== IPAA surgical procedure ==
In this elective and reconstructive surgical procedure, a pouch, or intestinal reservoir, made from ileum (small intestine) is attached to the anus after the colon (large intestine) and rectum have been removed.

- A J-pouch is two 15 to 20 cm sections of the small intestine formed into a J-shaped pouch in order to replace the function of the rectum and store stool until it can be eliminated. J-pouches can either be hand sewn or stapled. Most J-pouches today are constructed using linear staplers.
- An S-pouch is a hand-sewn formation consisting of three 15 cm limbs of terminal ileum to construct the S-shaped pouch with a 2 cm exit conduit at the bottom. The S-pouch was the first pouch formation originally premiered by Sir Alan Parks in 1976 in London. It was later found that the 2 cm conduit caused some people evacuation difficulties. Some people who received the earlier S-pouch design with the conduit, later underwent revision surgery to remove the conduit, if they experienced evacuation difficulties. Further, the S-pouch design was eventually advanced to remove the conduit since it was determined that the conduit caused some people with S-pouches, but not all, evacuation difficulties.
- The W-pouch is a hand-sewn pouch formation constructed using four loops of 12 cm length terminal ileum. The W-pouch was created by John Nicholls in the early 1980s at St Mark's Hospital in London as an augmentation of the S and J pouches with the aim to reduce frequency of movements. Unlike the S-pouch, it does not have an exit conduit at the bottom. It is essentially a combination of two Js to create the larger capacity W. The W-pouch is anastomosed directly to the anus the same as the J-pouch.

=== One-step IPAA surgery ===
The entire procedure can be performed in one operation, but is usually split into two or three procedures based on the person's overall health at the time of surgery.

=== Two-step IPAA surgery ===
If a colectomy is planned, and not done as an emergency due to severe injury or illness and the person is in good health, some surgeons will recommend a two-step procedure. When done as a two-step, the first operation (step one) involves a proctocolectomy (removal of the large intestine and rectum), and fashioning of the pouch. The patient is given a temporary defunctioning ileostomy (also known as a "loop ileostomy"). After a healing period determined by the surgeon based on the individual patient, the second step is performed, in which the ileostomy is reversed. This step is referred to as ileostomy reversal or takedown. The reason for the temporary ileostomy is to allow the newly constructed pouch to fully heal without waste passing through it, thus avoiding leaks that can lead to infection.

=== Three-step IPAA surgery ===
When a colectomy is performed as an emergency (which can arise from toxic megacolon and other complications including infection), or when the patient is extremely ill, the colectomy and pouch construction are performed in separate stages, resulting in a three-part surgery.

Outside of serious illness, some surgeons also prefer to perform a subtotal colectomy (removing all the colon except the rectum) first, since removal of the rectum can lead to complications with the anal sphincters. After the subtotal colectomy, the second operation consists of pouch creation with installation of a double or loop ileostomy to protect the pouch while it heals. Waste continues to exit through an opening in the abdominal wall. Then usually three to six months later when surgeons feel the pouch has healed, the loop stoma is reversed and the pouch becomes fully operational restoring intestinal continuity.

=== Anal anastomosis technique in IPAA ===
Just as debate continues on which formation of pouch functions best, there is also an ongoing discussion about the pouch's type of anal anastomosis - or method used to attach the pouch to the anal canal. Both methods have risks and benefits.

- Hand Sewn: Surgeons typically use this type of anal anastomosis to remove all of the rectal mucosal layer, although very small islands may still remain. A hand sewn anal anastomosis may be necessary when ulcerative colitis, FAP, or cancer patients retain disease in the anal canal to remove all remaining disease. When a hand sewn anastomosis is performed, it is typically placed at level called the dentate or pectinate line which is the transitional line between anal canal skin and colorectal mucosal layer. It is technically more demanding for a surgeon to perform a hand sewn anal anastomosis than a stapled anal anastomosis.
- Stapled: A stapled anal anastomosis is done using a tool that seals the pouch to the anal canal. Unlike with a hand sewn anastomosis that usually does not leave any mucosal layer, a staple pouch will retain 1–2 cm of rectal mucosal layer because the staple needs something to 'grab' to anastomose the pouch. This retained 1–2 cm of rectum is referred to as the 'cuff'. The cuff can retain disease and cause minor or more serious complications for some pouches. The ideal location for the staple is considered it be 1 cm above the dentate line at the level of the anorectal junction. The dentate line is the point where anal skin changes to the colonic mucosal layer that covers the rectum and large intestine or colon. Numerous studies have been published over the years showing that excessive length of the cuff can be a contributor to pouch failure due to retained disease and/or pouch dysfunction. Stapled anal anastomosis' are considered easier to perform than hand sewn which typically take more time and skill.

=== Fertility concerns and preservation for IPAA ===
The pouch can also be formed as part of a three step procedure for people of childbearing age who have not completed their family planning. When there is a wish for pregnancy, the process can be paused after subtotal colectomy until family planning is complete if doctors feel remaining disease in the rectum, if any, can be safely managed until removal during pouch creation.

==== Fertility reduction after ileum pouch surgery ====
A fall in female fertility was reported in a Danish study by Olsen et al. in 1999 showing a drop after pouch surgery to less than 50% of the normal population. There are well researched risks to fertility for both men and women. Highly specialized pouch centers globally typically offer fertility counselling as part of their patient selection and informed consent process.

==== Fertility risks for men and women ====
A rare risk to male fertility is nerve damage that impairs or prevents ejaculation. Risks to fertility for women include removal of the rectum reducing fertility by at least 50%, a dysfunctional pouch sparking a hostile environment in the pelvis preventing embryo implementation in the uterus and scar tissue formation over fallopian tubes blocking ovulation, although, scar tissue formation appears to be less likely with laparoscopic than open surgery.

==== Pouch surgery and IVF age limits ====
Women who choose the option to undergo pouch surgery before childbirth, should also undergo a fertility evaluation before surgery that includes an egg preservation consultation especially if she is over the age of 35 years. With the pouch surgery potentially reducing fertility, the in vitro fertilization (IVF) treatment a younger woman experiencing pouch related infertility may need to rely on to conceive, may not legally be available to the older woman if she later learns past the cutoff-age that her situation requires IVF to get pregnant. Most women are not aware of age limits to IVF treatment using their own eggs - especially if they are living, studying, or working away from their hometown or abroad at the time of their operations.

==== Pouch surgery and adoption age limits ====
The general public's lack of widespread knowledge about IVF regulations also applies to child adoption laws. Most men and women are not aware that some countries place age bans on adopting newborns. For example, in Germany adoption of an infant is prohibited if a parent is over the age of 40 years. These adoption age bans combined with the risk of pouch related fertility complications, plus potential IVF age cut-off limits then increases the need for a person to plan to preserve fertility before pouch surgery commences in order to improve chances of later completing a wish for a family.

== Pouch complications and disorders for IPAA ==
While most people who undergo elective reconstructive pouch surgery have either no issues or occasional minor discomfort, some pouches experience more serious complications that need medical management with a variety of therapies including medication and/or additional surgery.

=== Inflammatory disorders ===
- examples: pouchitis, cuffitis, Crohn's disease of the pouch, Celiac disease, IgG, IgG4

Pouchitis is a general term that refers to a wide spectrum of diseases and conditions that cause inflammation of the pouch. It is a common complication after IPAA/RPC. People report many symptoms including abdominal pain or cramps, increased bowel frequency, urgency of movements, strong evacuation urges, daytime incontinence, nocturnal seepage, and/or rectal bleeding. Studies show pouchitis occurs more often in people who got their pouch because of ulcerative colitis rather than familial adenomatous polyposis (FAP) which suggests that the pathogenic (microbial) background of UC may contribute to the development of pouchitis in some pouches.

Diagnosis of pouchitis: Pouchitis is diagnosed based on the presence of symptoms together with endoscopic and histological evidence of pouch inflammation. For example, biopsies may be taken during a pouchoscopy (a camera exam like a colonoscopy but for the pouch) to rule out infection from Clostridioides difficile infection (C-diff) or Cytomegalovirus (CMV). Treatment of infections usually begins with antibiotics and may also include multi-strain probiotics.

After exams and tests, pouchitis is divided into two categories based on findings: idiopathic or secondary. In idiopathic pouchitis, the cause of inflammation is still unclear. With secondary pouchitis, there is an association with a specific causative or pathogenetic factor. Secondary pouchitis can be classified into subgroups. It is possible to have one or more causes of pouch inflammation at the same time.

Antibiotic therapy for pouchitis: Standard treatment of pouchitis when first reported (acute pouchitis) without any other obvious cause identified such as infection or anal join leak (fistula) is oral antibiotics for two weeks, typically ciprofloxacin 500 mg every 12 hours. Alternatives to ciprofloxacin for initial therapy include metronidazole 500 mg (twice daily) or tinidazole 500 mg (twice daily).

For pouches with acute idiopathic pouchitis, response to antibiotic therapy is typically examined clinically by asking the patient if they have experienced an improvement with their symptoms plus looking endoscopically using a pouchoscopy after completing antibiotic therapy. While endoscopic mucosal healing may lag behind symptomatic improvement, mucosal healing is a treatment target for patients with pouchitis.

Cuffitis: Cuffitis is inflammation of the retained rectal 'cuff' usually in a stapled pouch-anal anastomosis or the spot where the intestinal pouch was attached to the anus to restore anal evacuation. Symptoms are typically similar to ulcerative proctosis for ulcerative colitis pouches including burning in the anal canal, a change in bowel movements, and sometimes rectal bleeding.

Cuffitis diagnosis: Most expert pouch centers plus national gastroenterology society guidelines worldwide recommend a cuff be no longer than 2 cm with the aim to staple the pouch at the level of the anorectal junction, leaving about 1 cm of rectum or mucus layer behind for the staple to attach the pouch to the anus. This retained 1 to 2 cm of rectum can therefore, sometimes retain ulcerative colitis in UC pouches. In contrast, hand sewn pouch-anal anastomosis' typically do not retain any mucus layer but sometimes a cuff is also used and it might cause discomfort for some hand sewn pouches. Cuffitis is clinically diagnosed by symptoms plus endoscopically (pouchoscopy).

Treatment of cuffitis: First-line therapy for acute cuffitis due to retained rectal mucosal layer is usually similar to the treatment for ulcerative proctosis that ulcerative colitis patients would have likely used before pouch surgery. Mesalazine suppositories or enemas are sometimes prescribed first (brand names include Asacol, Canasa, and Pentasa). If those do not provide enough relief then treatment might be escalated to corticosteroid suppositories or enemas such as Budesonide. Biological therapy may be prescribed if all other medical therapies fail to manage cuffitis and the person either is not suitable for or does not want to undergo a revision operation to remove the retained cuff and hand sew the pouch on the level of the dentate line (spot where anal skin changes to rectal mucus layer).

Crohn's disease of the pouch: Some people undergoing IPAA/RPC may be later diagnosed with underlying Crohn's disease because the disease likely had not fully expressed itself at the time of surgery. Crohn's disease of the pouch is associated with high failure rates. Pouches may experience fistula leaks that cause pelvic sepsis and other complications.

Treatment of Crohn's disease of the pouch: If a person later diagnosed with Crohn's disease of the pouch wishes to keep their pouch operational, in some circumstances medical management might be possible. Typically this is done with the prescription of biologics. It may take more than one drug prescription to find a suitable biologic that encourages the desired anti-inflammatory response.

Celiac disease: Celiac disease is an autoimmune condition that causes inflammation in the small intestine after gluten is eaten. It can cause pouchitis symptoms and discomfort. Some pouches that are celiac initially get misdiagnosed with Crohn's of the pouch. Celiac disease is typically diagnosed by biopsy of the pouch.

Treatment of Celiac disease: Typically, the first therapy approach to manage Celiac disease in person with an ileum pouch is dietary modification to reduce and/or eliminate gluten.

Other inflammatory conditions including IgG and IgG4: Immunoglobulin related diseases can also cause problems for a pouch. The two most common that are biopsied for are IgG and IgG4. IgG molecules can initiate inflammatory reactions, both good and bad. When the autoimmune reaction is inappropriate, a pouch might have problems with IgG. IgG4 is a subclass of IgG. IgG4 disease is a chronic immune-mediated fibroinflammatory disorder that can manifest with painless enlargement of organs or tumor-like masses.

=== Pouch infections ===
- examples: Clostridioides difficile infection (C. Diff) or Cytomegalovirus (CMV)

Biopsies of the pouch should confirm if an infection is the root cause of pouch inflammation. If an infection from Clostridioides difficile (C-diff) or Cytomegalovirus (CMV) is found, initial therapy is usually antibiotics. Certain infections such as a Clostridioides difficile (C-diff) might also be treated with probiotics just as a C-diff infection in a person who still has their colon would be treated. Probiotics that are prescribed for pouchitis (specifically pouchitis diagnosed as being caused by dysbiosis) are often also prescribed for C-diff.

=== Surgery related complications ===
- examples: anastomotic leaks, fistulas, sinus, pelvic sepsis

The pouch surgery itself can be the reason for some complications.

Anastomotic leaks: Anastomotic leaks occur on the lines where the pouch was sutured or stapled. They usually occur close to the time of surgery but can appear months or years later. When an anastomotic leak occurs, it can form a fistula or tract of fluid.

Fistulas: Most fistulas will connect from an anastomotic leak to another area of the body such as a pouch-vagina fistula, perianal fistula, or presacral fistula with pelvic collection. In some circumstances fistulas develop years after pouch creation due to the development of Crohn's disease. Fistula's caused by Crohn's disease are often treated with biological therapy while a fistula from an anastomotic leak requires different therapies as biologics rarely help close a leak in a surgical suture or staple line of the pouch. Different potential treatment options for an anastomotic fistula depend on the leak's location and include but are not limited to ENDO-Vac sponge, needle-knife therapy, draining seton, or cutting seton.

Pelvic collection/sinus: A pelvic collection or collection of fluid anywhere from a leak is called a sinus. When an anastomotic leak is not treated promptly or does not heal it can cause pelvic sepsis.

Pelvic sepsis: Pelvic sepsis also called peri pouch sepsis is a main cause of pouch failure and it creates conditions that make major revisionary surgery difficult.

=== Mechanical disorders ===
- examples: large or small pouch, U-bends, twists, prolapse, stricture, weak sphincters

Large or small pouch: Standard guidelines for J-pouch construction is to use two loops of 15–20 cm ileum. If the pouch is too small, the pouch will have a small volume. This will increase the frequency of moments and could also be a cause of pouch failure.

Pouch prolapse: A pouch can either tilt or twist when stapled onto the anus causing prolapse. Pouch prolapse is also sometimes referred to as a floppy pouch. Pouch prolapse from a pouch being tilted or twisted can also cause pouch fistulas to develop, especially pouch-vagina fistulas. Prolapse can also happen after the pouch is already in use. With symptoms for pouch prolapse, a person typically has evacuation difficulties, seepage, pain, nausea, abdominal pain, or overt external prolapse of tissue.

Strictures or stenosis Narrowing of the anal canal under the pouch can cause evacuation difficulties. Anal stricture can be a cause of pouch failure if not managed properly. Anal stricture is a common complication of pouch surgery. It is treated with dilatation or stretching under anesthesia. Some people are also prescribed home dilatation routine using a Hegar dilator to manage chronic stenosis that keeps returning after dilatation.

U-bend: This happens when the surgeon fires the linear stapler and it malfunctions. Usually the flaw is not noticed until after surgery is complete during first pouchoscopy. The pouch is called a "U" bend because instead of stapling the two full sections of ileum together into a "J", the stapler does not create the 'J' but instead retains the shape of a 'U'.

=== Functional disorders ===
- examples: irritable pouch syndrome, pelvic floor dysfunction, evacuation difficulties, coexisting psychiatric diagnosis

Pelvic floor dysfunction and evacuation difficulties Pelvic floor dysfunction is a common complication of pelvic surgery. The Mayo Clinic believes it is an under reported complication of IPAA/RPC surgery with up to 75% of pouch patients experiencing non-relaxing pelvic floor dysfunction. Biofeedback therapy is the main treatment for pelvic floor dysfunction.

=== Dysplasia or neoplasia ===
- examples: adenomas, cancers

Cancer is a rare event after a pouch is created. However, retained rectal mucosa can develop dysplasia over time especially if cuffitis is an ongoing complication. Cancer can also develop in the pouch when there has been long-term pouchitis (inflammation of the pouch for any reason). People who got their pouch as a result of bowel cancer may also experience cancer of the pouch.

=== Systemic or metabolic disorders ===
- examples: malnutrition, anemia, vitamin B12 and vitamin D deficiency, low potassium

Removal of the entire large intestine (colon) and amounts of the terminal ileum at the end of the small intestine leads to fluid and nutritional absorption issues for all pouches. The colon absorbs water, salts, and some key nutrients. Dehydration can occur if a person does not get enough fluids.

The importance of ileum is that it absorbs key vitamins and minerals including B12, potassium, and magnesium. In medical terms, low potassium is called hypokalemia. When a pouch is constructed small amounts of ileum are lost to the stomas and any stoma revisions. The pouch itself is also made from ileum. If a pouch is defunctioned (also explained as disconnected and/or pouch failure) the person also loses this extra amount of ileum when the pouch is disconnected from the digestive tract.

People with a pouch are at a further health risk if they experience excessive potassium loss due to things like vomiting, diarrhea, and prescription medications that increase urination. This is because potassium is a key electrolyte that helps regulate the heart and if levels become too low, a person can quickly become life-threateningly ill. When levels are dangerously low, medical intervention with supplementation either orally or intravenously becomes necessary.

=== Intestinal obstruction and perforation ===
Intestinal obstruction after ileal pouch-anal anastomosis (IPAA) surgery can occur due to various reasons such as adhesions (scar tissue ), strictures (narrowing at the anastomosis site), and Pouchitis (inflammation of the ileal pouch). Perforation at the site of attachment of the ileum to the rectum, or near the J-pouch, is a serious complication. It can occur due to several reasons. But sometimes when pouchitis is not treated well, it gradually weakens the intestinal wall, which can eventually perforate.

== Revision, redo, salvage surgery for IPAA pouch failure ==
When a pouch fails, suitable patients can choose to undergo surgery to repair the pouch or completely redo a pouch's anal-anastomosis or redo the entire pouch (if enough terminal ileum remains to produce a second pouch). The cause of the problem that triggered a person's need for pouch salvage surgery will determine which method an experienced revision surgeon recommends as the surgical approach most likely to produce the best result possible. Revisional surgeries are considered highly specialized. They require a skilled surgeon with complex revisional experience for the best chance at a good result. Many expert pouch surgeons advocate for early referrals to specialists for best outcomes.

=== IPAA repair procedures ===
Sometimes the root cause of pouch dysfunction can be managed with more conservative methods such as using an ENDO-Vac sponge for an anastomotic defect that leaks, needle knife therapy for fistulas and sinuses, or cutting seton for a low lying peri-anal fistula that does not impact the pouch's anal anastomosis (and many not even be related to the pouch itself). When a more conservative method will not work or an attempt fails, bigger surgicial salvage procedures are then recommended, if the operation will have a chance to succeed and restore quality of life.

=== Salvage surgery to redo an IPAA's anal anastomosis ===
If a pouch has a troubled anal-anastomosis that leaks and causes sepsis or if a person retained more than the recommended amount of rectum (a rectal cuff of no more than 2 cm follows global colorectal surgery recommendations for an ulcerative colitis person), then an experience surgeon may be able to 'redo' the anal anastomosis by removing excess rectum. Similarly, if a standard cuff of 1–2 cm was used, a revision surgeon still might be able to remove that and lower the pouch onto the anus. In this scenario, the surgeon typically tries to save and reuse the existing pouch, but this is not always possible if the pouch is also damaged from complications or has technical flaws. It might not be possible for an experienced salvage surgeon to redo an anal-anastomosis that has already been hand sewn or has a complication like a fistula or sepsis damage too close to the anus because this presents a surgical situation that is high risk to not heal properly and cause more complications.

=== Salvage surgery to redo an entire IPAA's pouch ===
If a person's pouch body is troubled, then an experienced pouch surgeon may be able to make a second pouch if the person's previous surgeries retained enough ileum to still safely create a second pouch. Experienced revision surgeons will not create a second pouch if it risks putting the person into nutritional difficulties (including short bowel syndrome) because too much small bowel would be lost.

=== Salvage surgery to rescue a pouch by altering shape ===
Occasionally, an experienced revision surgeon may need to alter the shape of the original pouch they are attempting to rescue. For example, when there is not enough ileum to create a second pouch or if the person's anatomy (mesentery and/or vascular supply) does not allow for the pouch to reach to the anus. This means the shape of a J-pouch may be transformed into an S, W, or even an H to repurpose functional ileum from the primary, or first pouch surgery, when retaining the original shape would not be successful but altering it could rescue the pouch situation.

=== Salvage surgery converting an anal pouch to Kock pouch ===
People can also choose to convert their failed ileo pouch-anal anastomosis (IPAA) to a continent ileostomy such as a Kock pouch in some circumstances.

=== Pouch removal surgery for failed IPAA pouch ===
If a repair or redo can not be undertaken because of factors like severe disease, or a repeat surgery fails, or a patient wishes to have their pouch removed with undergoing additional surgery, a pouch excision operation can be performed to remove the pouch. Removal of a pouch is a big operation that comes with complication risks.

== Quality of life after pouch surgery ==
Ileo pouch-anal anastomosis surgery (IPAA) also called Reconstructive Proctocolectomy (RPC) was originally designed and premiered to improve quality of life for people who needed to have their colon and rectum removed because it avoided the need for stool collection in an external bag and restored the anal evacuation route.

The surgical evolution of the anal pouch also empowered people who were forced to lose their colon and rectum because of disease with choice: they could decide to live their life with an ileostomy or undergo reconstructive surgery to restore anal evacuation.

Ileo pouch-anal anastomosis (IPAA) surgery is generally viewed as providing benefits over living with an ileostomy from a total proctocolectomy. However, not all people may consider extra surgery as a 'benefit' and therefore, some people opt to forgo the pouch option and remain living with an ileostomy after disease removal. Pouches are the individual's choice based on how a person wants to live their life.

=== Bowel motions with pouch ===
After the colon is removed a person does not have the ability to form solid stool. Because waste will always be liquid, people experience several movements per day when their pouch's capacity is full. The aim of pouch surgery is 4-8 movements per day, although, some people experience many more. The number of movements per day may seem similar to when someone was in an ulcerative colitis (UC) flare, for people who got their pouch as a result of UC. People with a small volume pouch will likely experience more movements.

Additionally, liquid stool directly from the ileum no longer benefits from the colon removing digestive enzymes before a bowel movement. This means liquid stool produced by the ileum can be aggressive on the skin around the anus. Discomfort, including experiencing itching and/or burning around the anus' opening, can be treated with creams, by using a squirt water bottle or hand bidet after each movement to wash away enzymes, or by placing a piece of gauze between buttocks to prevent seepage from irritating the skin around the anus.

The experience of learning how to use a newly functional anal pouch can be distressing for some. Sharp pains, explosive moments, and anal seepage are common initial sensations. Specialized pouch centers often have a pouch nurse that educates a person for how to safely empty the pouch without causing avoidable complications like incisional hernias after reversal or takedown surgery.

The process of adjusting to life with an anal pouch can take many months. Mayo Clinic research estimates that up to 75% of people with a pouch might experience some level of pelvic floor dysfunction after pouch surgery. For pouches that are difficult to evacuate or experience anal seepage, biofeedback therapy can be prescribed.

=== Dehydration risk with pouch ===
Water and salts are typically reabsorbed into the body by the colon or large intestine. However, people with an ileum pouch have lost their entire colon and at least small amounts of ileum. Experiences like having sudden diarrhea, vomiting from sickness, sweating in hot weather, sweating from physical exercise, or from not drinking enough fluids can all cause dehydration. Having an episode of pouchitis, or pouch inflammation, can also cause dehydration for some if the episode causes an increase in bowel movements.

This experiences mean that people with pouches, like people with ileostomies, will require drinking more fluids and eating more salt to not become dehydrated. Dehydration can cause feelings of dizziness, physical weakness, and/or fatigue. People may also notice that urine has changed from light yellow and become darker and more concentrated.

It is important that people with pouches maintain healthy fluid and salt levels because chronic dehydration increases the risk for kidney stones and even kidney failure. If a person becomes severely dehydrated, hospital admission for intravenous administration of fluids to restore hydration safely may be required.

=== Diet with pouch ===
Many people with a pouch eat their normal diet after surgery while others have to alter their diet due to discomfort when digesting certain foods. Others experience more watery output after eating specific foods like processed sugary snacks which may require some people with pouches to use dietary or medical interventions like fiber products or doctor prescribed tablets to control watery stool and prevent dehydration.

People with a pouch can follow any diet they choose while monitoring their overall nutritional status due to the loss of bowel causing absorption issues. People diagnosed with vitamin or mineral deficiencies may be prescribed injections or tablets. Others may be referred to a nutritionist to design meals that provide additional amounts of needed vitamins and minerals. Studies show that some foods may also contribute to pouch inflammation.

== Support for pouch candidates and pouchees ==
Having an intestinal pouch is considered a rare condition. Some national organizations and specialist charities usually associated with inflammatory bowel disease (IBD) or ostomies provide some information to people considering or who have chosen to undergo elective pouch surgery. Some of the larger national organizations globally include:

- Crohn's and Colitis - Australia
- Crohn's and Colitis - Canada
- Gastrointestinal (GI) Society - Canada
- German Crohn's Disease and Ulcerative Colitis Society - Germany
- European Crohn's and Colitis Organisation - Europe
- Crohn's and Colitis - UK
- Red Lions Group pouch support charity - UK
- Crohn's and Colitis Foundation - US
- The J-Pouch Group online community - US
- United Ostomy Association (UOA) - US

== See also ==
- De Simone Formulation
