= Sahlgrenska University Hospital =

University Hospital in Sweden

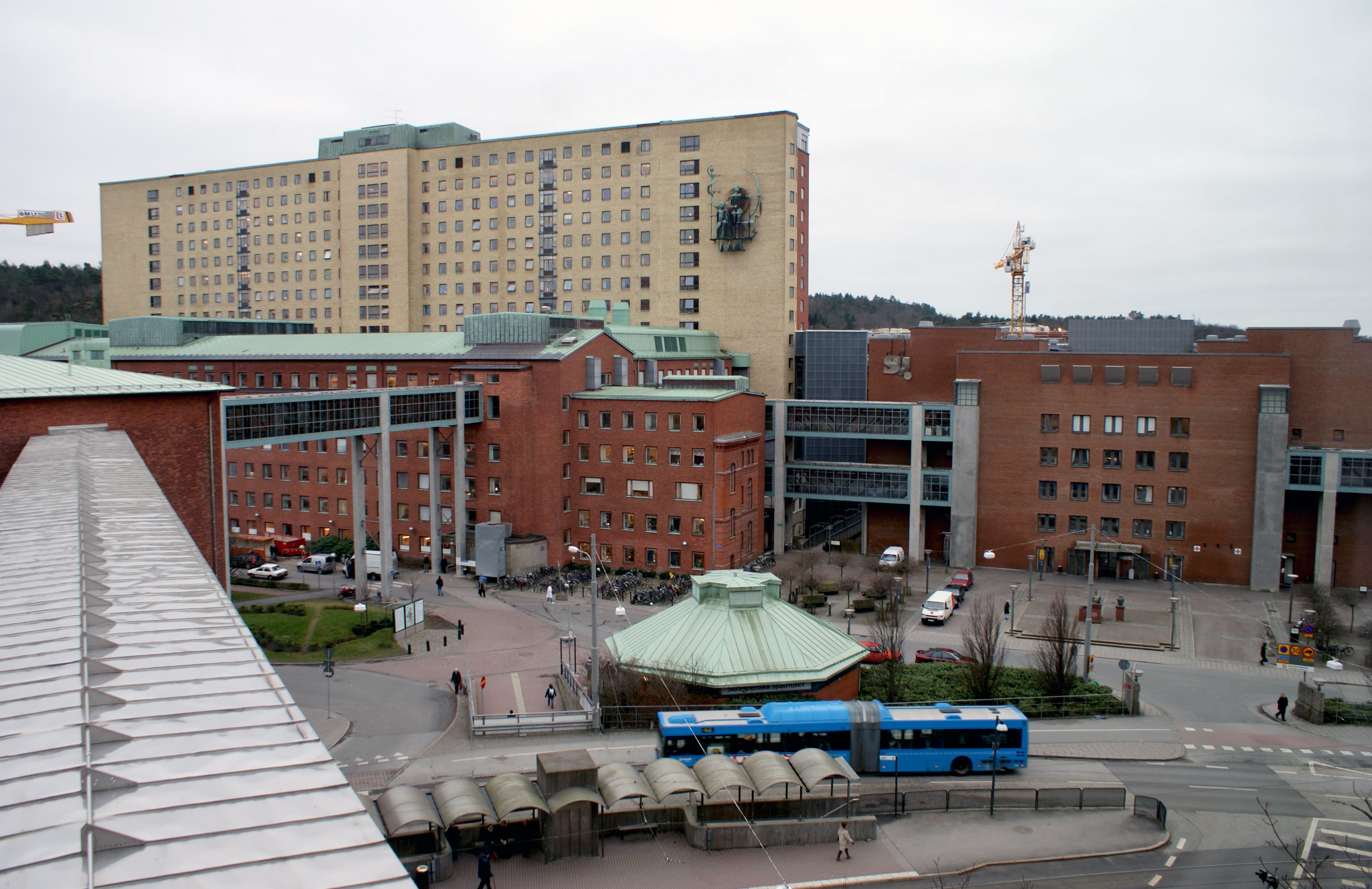
- Sahlgrenska University Hospital

Geography
- Location: Gothenburg, Sweden

Organisation
- Type: Teaching
- Affiliated university: Sahlgrenska Academy, University of Gothenburg
- Patron: Ann-Marie Wennberg

Services
- Beds: 2,000

History
- Founded: 1 January 1997; 29 years ago

Links
- Website: www.sahlgrenska.se

The Sahlgrenska University Hospital (Swedish: Sahlgrenska Universitetssjukhuset) is a hospital network associated with the Sahlgrenska Academy at the University of Gothenburg in Gothenburg, Sweden. With 17,000 employees the hospital is the largest hospital in Sweden by a considerable margin, and the third largest hospital in Europe. It has 2,000 beds distributed across three campuses in Sahlgrenska, Östra, and Mölndal. It provides emergency and basic care for the 700,000 inhabitants of the Gothenburg region and offers highly specialised care for the 1.7 million inhabitants of West Sweden. It is named after philanthropist Niclas Sahlgren.

== History ==
Sahlgrenska University Hospital was formed in 1997 by the merger of three hospitals: Sahlgrenska Hospital, Östra Hospital, and Mölndal Hospital. The Sahlgrenska University Hospital has been operated by the Västra Götaland Regional Council since its formation in 1999.

=== The Sahlgrenska Academy ===
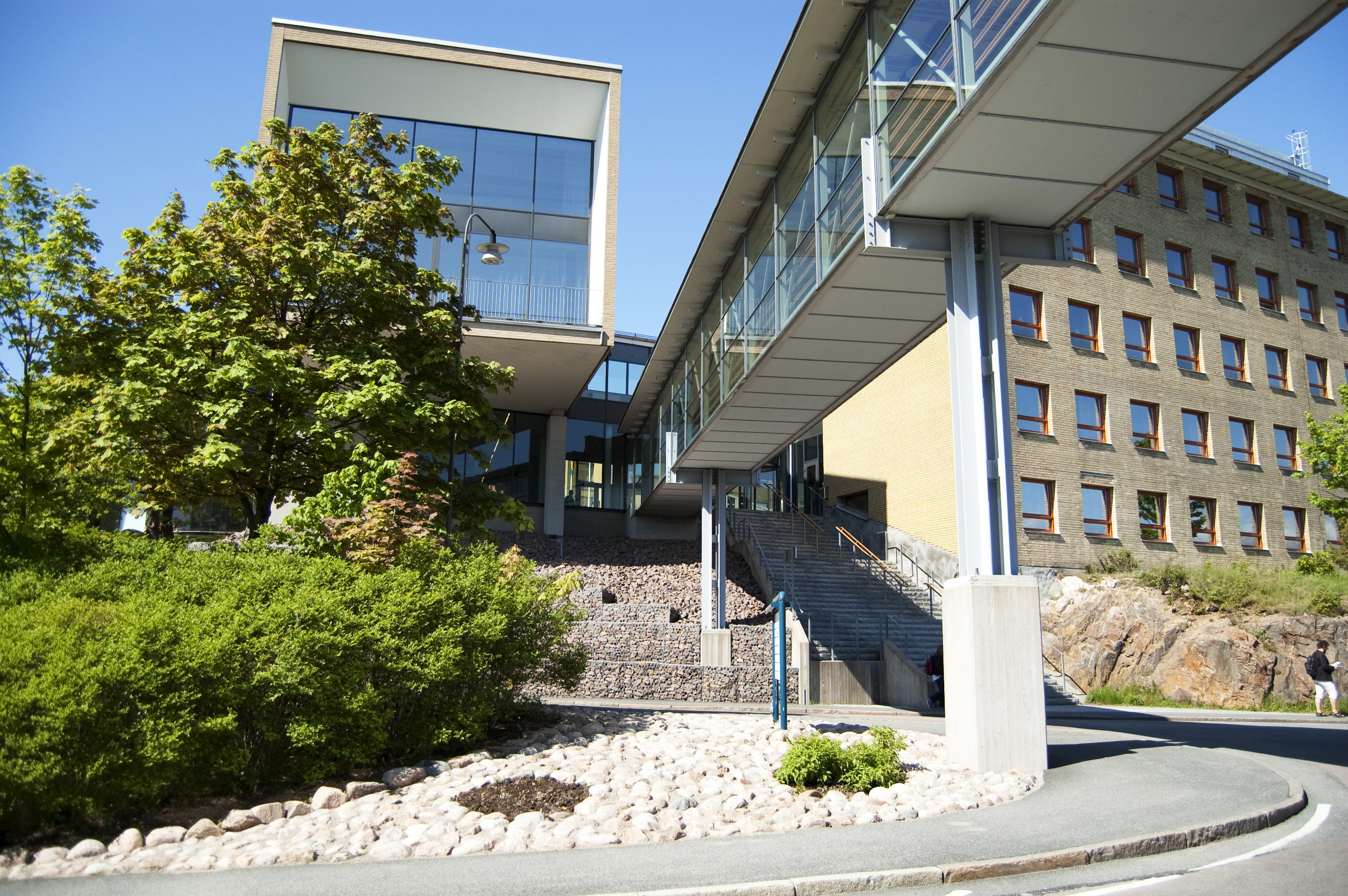
Sahlgrenska Academy

Sahlgrenska Academy is the University of Gothenburg's faculty of education and research in health sciences. It operates in close conjunction with the university hospital. The academy was formed the 1st of July 2001 by combining the three previous faculties for medicine, odontology and health sciences. Within the academy is the Sahlgrenska Cancer Center, focusing on translational oncology research. The center is a joint effort between the Sahlgrenska Academy at University of Gothenburg and the Sahlgrenska University Hospital. The long-term goal of the center is to improve the care of cancer patients by facilitating new scientific discoveries and translating these into clinical practice.

Educational programs are available in biomedical, dietitian sciences, physician, nursing, medical specialist, dentist, and medical physicist. With Sahlgrenska academy's focus, University of Gothenburg is ranked worldwide 33 and 40 for Clinical medicine and Biomedical sciences respectively in the subject ranking by Academic Ranking of World Universities AWRU Shanghai (2018).

The Sahlgrenska University Hospital in the Webometrics Hospital specific ranking 2017, was 1st in Sweden, 10th in Europe and 41st worldwide.

== Hospitals ==
=== Sahlgrenska Hospital ===
Sahlgrenska Hospital is the oldest and largest hospital in the network. It was founded in 1782 in Sillgatan (now Postgatan) in Gothenburg with a donation by Niclas Sahlgren. In 1823, it was moved to Oterdahl House, today a museum of medical history. In 1855, it was moved again to a building (now named Sociala Huset) in Carolus Dux at Västra Hamngatan and named Allmänna and Sahlgrenska Hospital. Since 1900, it was moved to its present premises in Änggården, and in 1936 it was named the Sahlgrenska Hospital.

On 24 June 2009, a 24,000 m^{2} (260,000 sq ft) new facility with 312 beds was officially opened. The new facility will enable rebuilding and renovation of older facilities at Sahlgrenska. The facility also features nephrology centre, dialysis, transplantation centre, stroke unit, hematology, and wards for medicine and surgery.

=== Östra Hospital ===
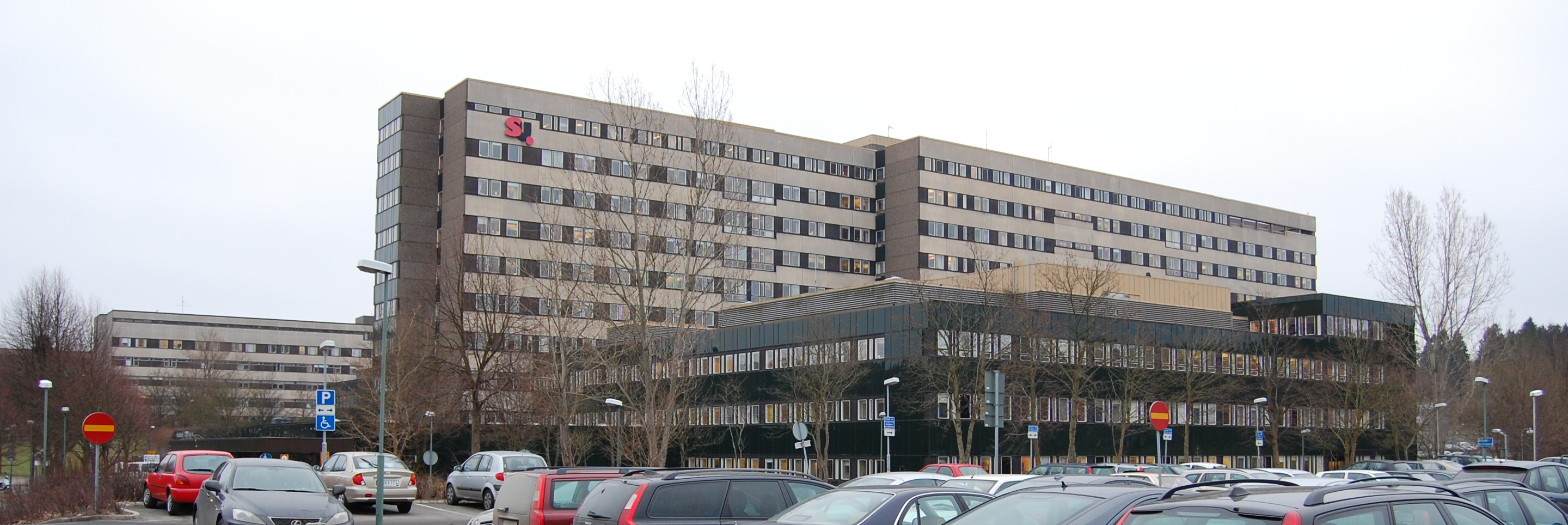
SU Östra

Östra Hospital was built during the 1960s.

=== Mölndal Hospital ===
Mölndal Hospital was completed on 14 May 1924, to replace an old hospital in Mölndals Kvarnby.

== Notable people ==
- Mats Brännström; professor of obstetrics and gynaecology; leader of the team behind the first successful uterus transplantation.
- Nils Kock; former chief of surgical staff; developer of the Kock pouch surgical procedure.
- Katharina Sunnerhagen, professor of rehabilitation medicine; created guidelines for stroke rehabilitation

== In popular culture ==
Lisbeth Salander, a central character in the Millennium series by Stieg Larsson, is treated at Sahlgrenska Hospital after being shot.
