= Nils Kock =

Professor of surgery and developer of the Kock pouch (1924–2011)

Nils G. Kock
- Born: January 29, 1924; Jakobstad, Finland
- Died: August 24, 2011 (aged 87); Sahlgrenska University Hospital, Gothenburg, Sweden
- Education: University of Helsinki Medical School
- Medical career
- Profession: Surgeon, teacher
- Field: Internal Medicine
- Institutions: University of Gothenburg, Sweden
- Sub-specialties: Creator of the Kock pouch surgical technique
- Research: ileostomy

Nils G. Kock (January 29, 1924 – August 24, 2011) was a professor of surgery who taught and practiced at the University of Gothenburg, Gothenburg, Sweden. Kock was noted for his research, experimentation, and colorectal surgical techniques. These led to his breakthrough development of the Kock pouch, used for people who require excretory stomas.

== Personal life and education ==
Kock was born in Jakobstad, Finland in 1924. Following military service in the Finnish Army during World War II, he attended the University of Helsinki Medical School, and graduated in 1951. He immediately began his surgical residency there. Later, Kock spent five years in surgical training at the University of Gothenburg in Sweden, an institution he remained affiliated with for the rest of his professional career. While there, in 1959, Kock obtained his PhD and subsequently assumed the position of assistant professor of Surgery. He later became chairman of the medical department of Sahlgren Hospital. In 1974, Kock became a full professor at Gothenburg.

== Career ==
In the course of his medical career, Kock published over 300 papers.

In the 1960s, Kock experimented on cats and dogs in an effort to develop an internal "continent bladder" which used a reservoir created from the small intestine of candidates receiving ileostomy surgery. In 1969, he published his manuscript detailing a technique he had established of creating an intra-abdominal reservoir, offering an alternative to conventional ileostomy which required the use of external appliances to collect waste. Ileostomy is the procedure whereby individuals with a number of intestinal malfunctions (such as those arising from ulcerative colitis, familial polyposis, late-stage Crohn's disease, and others), are equipped with stomas for excretory purposes. His work culminated with the initial development of the continent ileostomy procedure, which became known as the Kock pouch. The first Kock pouch continent ileostomy procedure was executed in 1969. For the very first time, a patient with an ileostomy could have complete control over the discharge of their intestinal waste.

=== Kock pouch procedure ===
The Kock pouch procedure substantially improved the quality of life for patients, especially when the surgery resulted in a well-functioning Kock pouch for fecal diversion. The technique, however, was not without some drawbacks.

Pouchitis, a term coined by Kock to describe the reservoir ileitis seen in recipients of any pouch procedure, is a common one. Also, the first Kock pouches were not created with any type of valve mechanism. The procedure required additional development, work which Kock continued to advance through further experimentation into the 1970s and 1980s. Early experience showed that 50% of those receiving the procedure would not stay continent afterward. Kock developed what he termed a "nipple valve" in 1972 to help eliminate a portion of these problems. The nipple valve was created from intestinal tissue itself.

An ongoing problem with the Kock procedure had been its inability to maintain the drainage valve (or stoma) in the proper position, even with the inclusion of the nipple. The failure rate was 25-40%. Much of Kock's work in the 1970s concentrated on ways to stabilize the valve. The problem was eventually solved by William O. Barnett's development of the Barnett continent intestinal reservoir—one of the J-pouch modifications of Kock's procedure.

== Later career, and death ==
Kock's work after 1985 was mainly on the development of continent urostomies, which gave rise to the development of the "Urethral-Kock pouch after Cystoprostatectomy" technique.

Later in his career, Kock became a visiting lecturer worldwide in order to educate and advance the use of his urostomy surgical technique into Third World nations where bilharzial disease was prevalent. He collaborated for years with Egyptian Professor of Urology, Mohamed Ghoneim, from the medical department of the University of Mansoura (which at the time was a branch of Cairo University). He focused on perfecting his procedure and educating others in the use of his life-improving surgical techniques.

Kock retired from the university hospital in 1990. Still traveling to lecture, he was the recipient of the Société Internationale d'Urologie—Alstellas European Foundation Award in 1997.

Kock died August 24, 2011, at his residence in Gothenburg, Sweden.
