= Ileostomy =

Surgical procedure

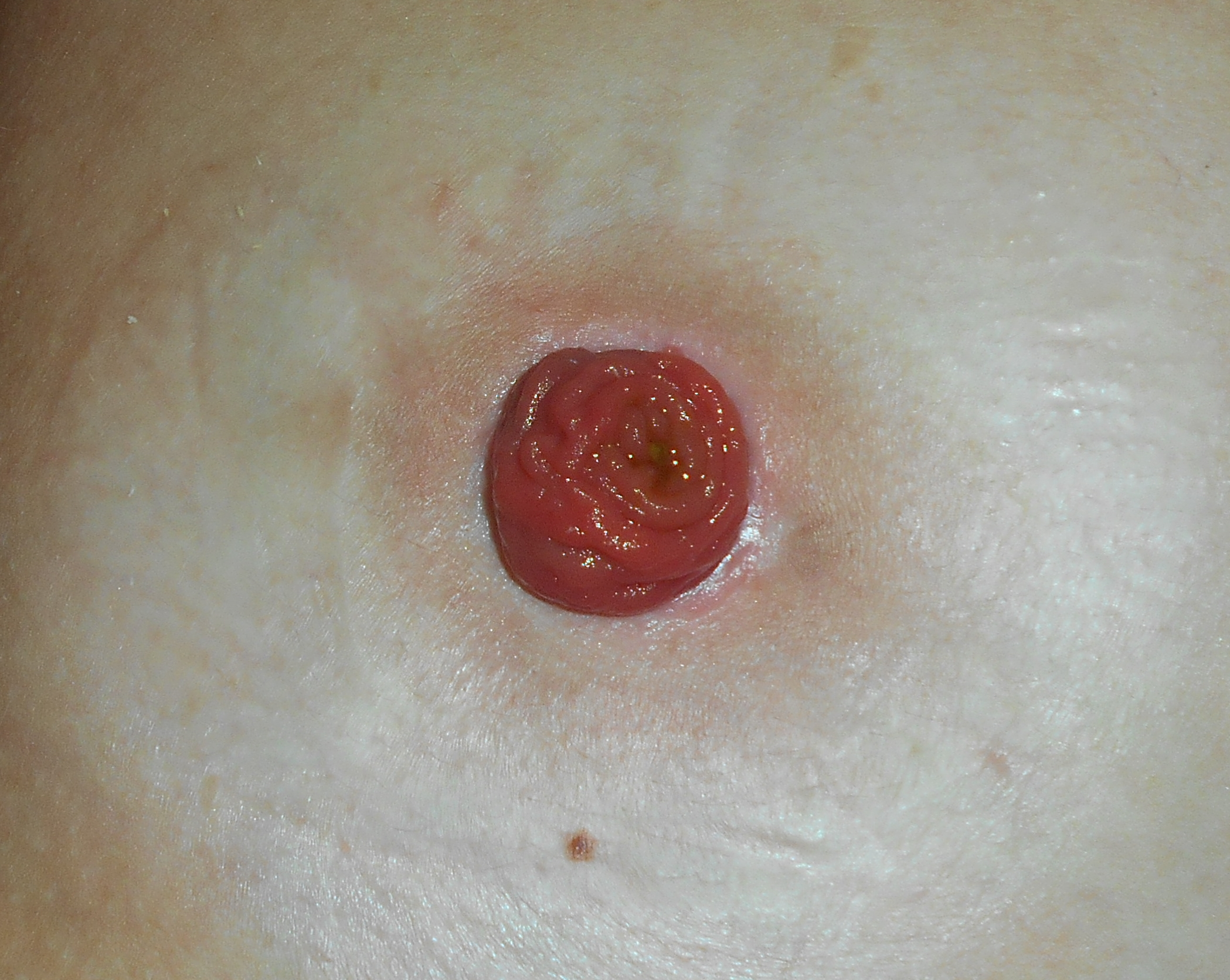
- Ileostomy
- ICD-9-CM: 46.2
- MeSH: D007081
- MedlinePlus: 007378

Ileostomy is a stoma (surgical opening) constructed by bringing the end or loop of small intestine (the ileum) out onto the surface of the skin, or the surgical procedure which creates this opening. Intestinal waste passes out of the ileostomy and is collected in an external ostomy system which is placed next to the opening. Ileostomies are usually placed above the groin on the right hand side of the abdomen.

== Uses ==
Ileostomies are necessary where injury or a surgical response to disease has meant the large intestine cannot safely process waste, typically because the colon and rectum have been partially or wholly removed.

Diseases of the large intestine which may require surgical removal include Crohn's disease, ulcerative colitis, familial adenomatous polyposis, and total colonic Hirschsprung's disease. An ileostomy may also be necessary in the treatment of colorectal cancer or ovarian cancer. One example is a situation where the cancer tumor is causing a blockage (obstruction). In such a case, the ileostomy may be temporary, as the common surgical procedure for colorectal cancer is to reconnect the remaining sections of colon or rectum following removal of the tumor provided that enough of the rectum remains intact to preserve internal/external anal sphincter function.

In an end ileostomy, the end of the ileum is everted (turned inside out) to create a spout and the edges are sutured under the skin to anchor the ileum in place. Permanent ileostomies are usually done this way. An end ileostomy may be temporary, notably if some of the large intestine was removed and the bowel or overall health is not considered amenable to tolerating further surgery, such as an anastomosis to rejoin the small and large intestines.

=== Duration ===
In a temporary or loop ileostomy, a loop of the ileum is surgically brought through the skin creating a stoma, but keeping the lower portion of the ileum for future reattachment in cases where the entire colon and rectum are not removed but need time to heal. Temporary ileostomies are also often made as the first stage in surgical construction of an ileo-anal pouch, so fecal material does not enter the newly made pouch until it heals and has been tested for leaks—usually requiring a period of eight to ten weeks. When healing is complete the temporary ileostomy is then "taken down" (or reversed) by surgically repairing the loop of intestine which made the temporary stoma and closing the skin incision.

== Living with an ileostomy ==
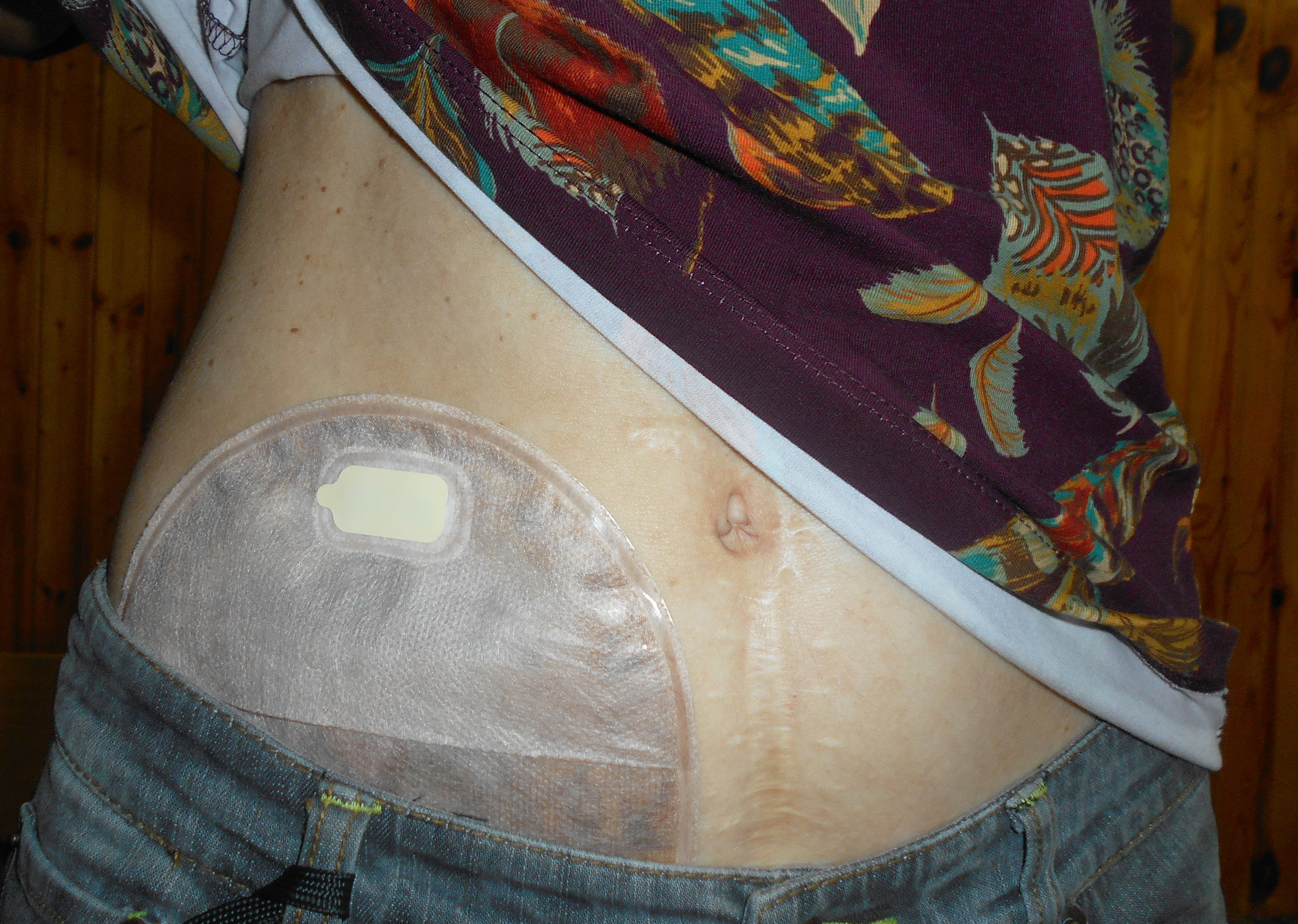
Ileostomy with bag (pouch).

People with ileostomies must use an ostomy pouch to collect intestinal waste. People with ileostomies typically use an open-ended (referred to as a "drainable") one- or two-piece pouch that is secured at the lower end with a leakproof clip, or velcro fastener. The alternative is the closed-end pouch that must be thrown away when full. Ordinarily, the pouch must be emptied five to eight times a day. If the bag stays empty for more than four to six hours, individuals should contact their healthcare provider, as this may indicate intestinal blockage. The pouch and flange (both one and two piece pouches) are usually changed every 2–5 days.

Ostomy pouches fit close to the body and are usually not visible under regular clothing unless the pouch becomes too full. It is necessary to measure the stoma regularly as it changes shape after the initial surgery. The stomal- or colorectal-nurse does this initially for a patient and advises them on the exact size required for the pouch's opening. Changes in size and shape can indicate a problem and may signal a need to call a healthcare provider.

Some people find they must make adjustments to their diet after having an ileostomy. It is important for individuals to consult with their healthcare providers. Tough or high-fiber foods (for example: potato skins, tomato skins, and raw vegetables) are hard to digest in the small intestine and may cause blockages or discomfort when passing through the stoma. Chewing food thoroughly can reduce such problems. Some people find that certain foods cause annoying gas or diarrhea. Many foods can change the color of the intestinal output, causing alarm; beetroot, for instance, produces a red output that may appear to be blood. Nevertheless, people who have an ileostomy as treatment for inflammatory bowel disease typically find they can enjoy a more "normal" diet than they could before surgery. Correct dietary advice is essential in combination with the patient's gastroenterologist and hospital-approved dietician. Supplementary foods may be prescribed and liquid intake and output monitored to correct and control output. If the output contains blood, an ileostomate (patient) is advised to visit an emergency department.

After having ileostomies, people may continue to take baths and showers and have an active lifestyle. These and other topics are important to discuss with healthcare providers.

Complications can include kidney stones, gallstones, and post-surgical adhesions.

== Other options ==
In some patients with Crohn's disease, a procedure called an ileoanal anastomosis is done if the disease affects the entire colon and rectum, but leaves the anus unaffected. In this procedure, the entire large intestine and rectum is surgically removed, and the ileum is then stitched to the anus to allow fecal matter to go through the ileum just as it did when the patient had a large intestine. This procedure requires a temporary loop ileostomy to allow the anastomosis to heal. With lifestyle adjustments, those who have had this procedure for their Crohn's disease can resume normal bowel movements without artificial appliances. However, there is always the possibility of disease relapse, as Crohn's can affect mouth to anus.

Since the late 1970s, an increasingly popular alternative to an ileostomy has been the Barnett continent intestinal reservoir (or BCIR). The formation of this pouch (made possible through a procedure first pioneered by Nils Kock in 1969), involves the creation of an internal reservoir which is formed using the ileum and connecting it through the abdominal wall in a very similar fashion to a standard "Brooke" ileostomy. The BCIR procedure should not be confused with a J-pouch, which is also an ileal reservoir, but is connected directly to the anus—after removal of the colon and rectum—avoiding the need for subsequent use of external appliances. Because continent ileostomies can cause problems and may need redoing, they are not often done. However, continent ileostomies can be considered depending on surgeon experience, patient characteristics, and other factors.

=== Barnett continent intestinal reservoir ===
The Barnett continent intestinal reservoir (BCIR) is a type of an appliance-free intestinal ostomy. The BCIR was a modified Kock pouch procedure pioneered by William O. Barnett. It is a surgically created pouch, or reservoir, on the inside of the abdomen, made from the last part of the small intestine (the ileum), and is used for the storage of intestinal waste. The pouch is internal, so the BCIR does not require wearing an appliance or ostomy bag.

==== How it works ====
The pouch works by storing the liquid waste, which is drained several times a day using a small silicone tube called a catheter. The catheter is inserted through the surgically created opening on the abdomen into the pouch called a stoma. The capacity of the internal pouch increases steadily after surgery: from 50 cm^{3}, when first constructed, to 600–1000 cm^{3} over a period of months, when the pouch fully matures.

The opening through which the catheter is introduced into the pouch is called the stoma. It is a small, flat, button-hole opening on the abdomen. Most patients cover the stoma site with a small pad or bandage to absorb the mucus that accumulates at the opening. (Note: Patients may place a simple dressing over the flush stoma.) This mucus formation is natural, and makes insertion of the catheter easier. The BCIR requires no external appliance and it can be drained whenever it is convenient. Most people report draining the pouch 2–4 times a day, and most times they sleep through the night. This can vary depending on what kinds and quantities of food eaten. The process of draining the pouch is simple and quickly mastered. The stoma has no nerve endings, and inserting the catheter is not painful. The process of inserting the catheter and draining the pouch is called intubation and takes just a few minutes.

==== Background and origin ====
Finnish surgeon Nils Kock developed the first intra-abdominal continent ileostomy in 1969. This was the first continent intestinal reservoir. By the early 1970s, several major medical centers in the United States were performing Kock pouch ileostomies on patients with ulcerative colitis and familial polyposis. One problem with these early Kock pouches was valve slippage, which often resulted in difficulty intubating and an incontinent pouch. As a result, many of these pouches had to be revised or removed to allow a better quality of life.

William O. Barnett began modifying the Kock pouch in 1979. He believed in the concept of the continent reservoir, but was disappointed with the valve's relatively high failure rate. Barnett was intent on solving the problem. (Note: Barnett states that over a period of nine years (and 315 patients) they strove to decrease malfunctioning pouches and the need for additional operations.) His first change was in the construction of the nipple valve. He changed the direction of flow within this segment of intestine to keep the valve in place. This greatly improved the success rate. (Note: The intestinal collar communicates with the pouch in such a way that buttresses the nipple valve and conduit, providing increased security against leakage.) In addition, he used a plastic material called Marlex to form a collar around the valve. This further stabilized and supported the valve, decreasing valve slippage. This technique worked well, but after several years, the intestine reacted to the Marlex by forming fistulae (abnormal connections) into the valve. Dr. Barnett continued his investigation in an effort to improve these results. After much effort, the idea came to him—a "living collar" constructed from the small intestine itself. This technique made the valve more stable and eliminated the problems the Marlex collars had presented.

After a test series of over 300 patients, Barnett moved to St. Petersburg, Florida where he joined the staff of Palms of Pasadena Hospital, where he trained other surgeons to perform his continent intestinal reservoir procedure. With the assistance of James Pollack, the first BCIR Program was established. Both surgeons further enhanced the procedure to bring it to where it is today. These modifications included reconfiguring the pouch to decrease the number of suture lines from three to one (this allowed the pouch to heal faster and reduced the chance of developing fistulae); and creating a serosal patch over the suture lines which prevented leakage. (Note: Leakage through one of the reservoir suture lines used to be a much more common complication than it is today, thanks to improved construction of the reservoir and careful selection of patients.) The end result of these developments has been a continent intestinal reservoir with minimal complications and satisfactory function.

==== Surgical candidates ====
Ulcerative colitis and familial adenomatous polyposis are the two main health conditions that lead to removal of the entire colon (large intestine) and rectum, which leads to the need for an ileostomy. (Note: There is no cure for ulcerative colitis, but surgery may be recommended in chronic cases where medical therapy fails. Surgical options include a proctocolectomy, or creating a Brooke ileostomy or continent ileostomy.)

Candidates for BCIR include: people who are dissatisfied with the results of an alternate procedure (whether a conventional Brooke ileostomy or another procedure); patients with a malfunctioning/failed Kock pouch or IPAA/J-pouch; and individuals with poor internal/external anal sphincter control who either elect not to have the J-pouch (IPAA) or are not a good candidate for IPAA.

There are, however, some contraindications for having the BCIR surgery. BCIR is not for people who have or need a colostomy, people with [active] Crohn's disease, mesenteric desmoids, obesity, advanced age, or poor motivation.

When Crohn's disease only affects the colon, it may, in select cases, be appropriate to perform a BCIR as an alternative to a conventional ileostomy. If the small intestine is affected, however, it is not safe to have the BCIR (because the internal pouch is created out of the small intestine, which must be healthy).

A patient must have an adequate length of small intestine to be considered a potential candidate.

==== Success rates and case studies ====
ASCRS study, 1995

A 1995 study by the American Society of Colon and Rectal Surgeons included 510 patients who received the BCIR procedure between January 1988 and December 1991. All patients were between 1–5 years post-op with an admitting diagnosis of ulcerative colitis or familial polyposis. The study was published in Diseases of the Colon and Rectum in June 1995. The study found that:

- Approximately 92% of the patients have functional BCIR pouches at least one year after surgery;
- 87.2% of patients required no or minor subsequent surgery to ensure a functioning pouch;
- 6.5% of patients required subsequent excision (removal) of the pouch (with the majority of these having occurred within the first year (63.6%);
- Re-operation rate for major pouch-related complications (other than pouch removal) was 12.8% (including: slipped valve (6.3%), valve fistulas (4.5%), and pouch fistulas (6.3%));

- Of the 32 patients treated for valve slippage, 23 achieved a fully functioning pouch. Pouch or valve fistulas affected 52 patients, 39 ultimately achieved successful results. Pouch leaks occurred in 11 patients, of these 7 have functioning pouches.

- Complications not related to the pouch itself parallel those that accompany other abdominal surgeries; with the most frequent being small bowel obstruction (which occurred in 50 patients, 20 of whom required surgical intervention);
- "Several questions were administered to patients whose responses revealed a significant improvement in general quality of life, state of mind, and overall health; Over 87% of the patients in this study feel their quality of life is better after having the BCIR.

The study concluded: "BCIR represents a successful alternative to patients with a conventional Brooke ileostomy or those who are not candidates for the IPAA."

ASCRS special study, 1999

In 1999, American Society of Colon and Rectal Surgeons published a unique study on 42 patients with a failed IPAA/J-pouch who converted to the Barnett modification of the Kock pouch (BCIR). The authors noted that their study was significant in the very large number of patients, approximately 6 times more than studied by any previous author. The study was published in Diseases of the Colon and Rectum in April 1999. The study found:

- that forty (95.2%) patients of the failed IPAA population reported fully functioning pouches;
- that two pouches had been excised, one after development of a pouch vesical fistula, the other after emergence of Crohn's disease, which had not been diagnosed at the time of the original colectomy;
- that "Forty (100%) of the patients with failed IPAAs who retained their pouch rated their life after the continent ileostomy as better or much better than before."

The study concluded: "The continent ileostomy offers an alternative with a high degree of patient satisfaction, to those patients who face the loss of an IPAA."
