= Elise Sørensen =

Danish nurse and inventor of the colostomy bag

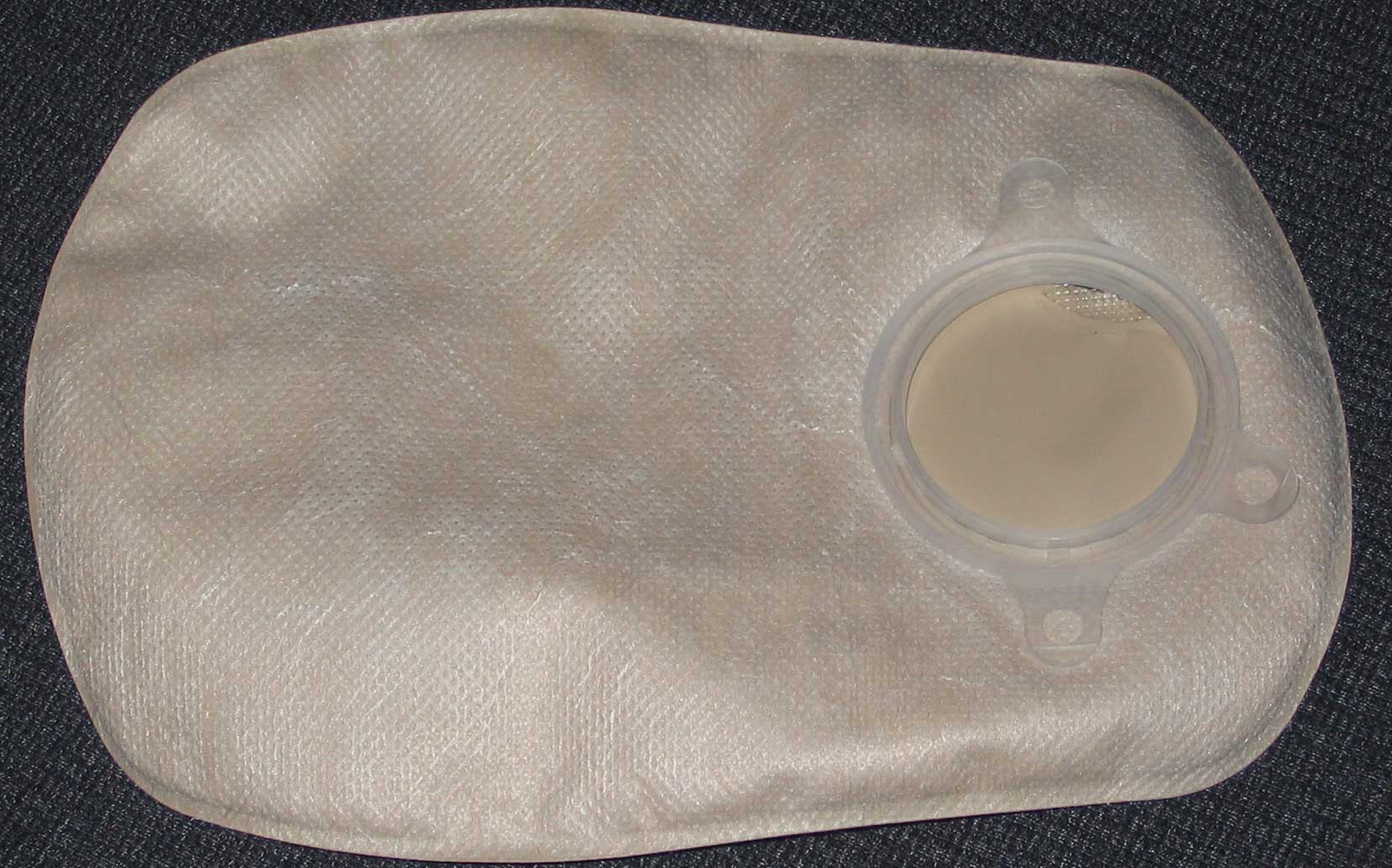
Ostomy Pouch

Elise Sørensen (Kalundborg, 2 July 1903 – Ordrup, 5 July 1977) was a Danish nurse and the inventor of the colostomy bag.

== Life and career ==
Sørensen was born on 2 July 1903 in Kalundborg to Valdemar Sofus and Ane Dorthea (née Andersen) and was educated in Holbæk and Viborg. She worked as a home care nurse from 1929, including over twenty years at a health insurance company in Ordrup-Skovshoved.

In 1953 her sister had an ostomy operation (a procedure that takes the end of the intestine out through the abdomen, allowing waste to exit via a surgically created stoma). After the operation, Sørensen's sister was uncomfortable going outside due to fear that stoma might leak, due to the metal/glass capsules or fabric/rubber bags that people used at the time. Sørensen then created the world's first disposable ostomy bag attachable through an adhesive ring. With help from a lawyer from the Danish Nurses' Association, she applied for a patent for her invention in 1954 and approached the plastics manufacturer Aage Louis-Hansen for assistance with putting the bag into wider production. Louis-Hansen initially declined, but was persuaded to agree by his wife, Johanne Louis-Hansen, who was also a nurse and saw the clinical need. Sørensen paid for the initial manufacturing costs herself and oversaw testing of the bags on patients at various institutions. Louis-Hansen founded the company Coloplast in 1957 on the basis of Sørensen's invention.

Sørensen ceased working in 1957 due to issues with depression. She died on 5 July 1977 in a psychiatric hospital where she had spent her final years.
