= Systemic administration =

Systemic administration is a category of routes of administration of medication, nutrition or other substance into the circulatory system where the entire body is affected. Administration can take place via enteral administration (absorption of the drug through the gastrointestinal tract, e.g. oral and rectal) or parenteral administration (generally injection, infusion, or implantation).

Contrast with topical administration where the effect is generally local.
