= De Simone Formulation =

Medical food, probiotic formulation

The De Simone Formulation is a probiotic formula and manufacturing method developed by Claudio De Simone.

The De Simone Formulation has been clinically studied for a variety of health conditions since the 1990s but it has been researched the most for its efficacy in the medical management of chronic intestinal conditions including irritable bowel syndrome (IBS) and inflammatory bowel disease (IBD).

== Lawsuits ==
The De Simone Formulation has been the subject of lawsuits. In the United States, the 4th U.S. Circuit Court of Appeals upheld a false advertising verdict against the makers of the VSL#3 probiotic in February 2021 stating there was enough evidence to support a jury's November 2018 finding that the makers of VSL#3 had "reverse-engineered an imperfect copy" of De Simone's signature probiotic formulation that was sold under the brand name VSL#3 until May 2016 after he withdrew from their joint venture, VSL Pharmaceuticals Inc. According to the lawsuit, his departure was as a result of being pressured to substitute cheaper bacteria in the manufacturing process to lower production costs and raise profits. Court action states that De Simone apparently refused. The makers of VSL#3 were ordered to pay De Simone and ExeGi Pharma a combined total of $18 million (USD) in damages.

The Court also issued a permanent injunction intended to prevent claims, implied or stated, of continuity between the two different formulations. The court also cited public health and wellbeing concerns, when they blocked the makers of VSL#3 from linking their product with the original De Simone Formulation by referring to clinical studies that were executed using the De Simone Formulation prior to May 2016.

== Scientific research ==
On August 1, 2019, the American Gastroenterology Association (AGA), the medical association of gastroenterologists in the United States, issued a correction regarding the De Simone Formulation and VSL#3. AGA's correction stated it had referenced studies in its 2019 Technical Review on the Management of Mild-to-Moderate Ulcerative Colitis that were based on the probiotic formulation previously known by the brand name VSL#3 before May 2016, but was now known by the formulation name 'De Simone Formulation'.

On January 24, 2022, the European Crohn's and Colitis Organisation (ECCO) issued a letter to the editor of Oxford Academic's Journal of Crohn's and Colitis (JCC) stating that, as a result of a court injunction, the ECCO must provide a clarification note for changes relating to VSL#3 and the De Simone Formulation in their articles that reference or studied these probiotics.
