= Victor Warren Fazio =

Australian pioneering colorectal surgeon (1940–2015)

Victor Fazio, MBBS FRACS
- Born: 2 February 1940; Sydney, Australia
- Died: 6 July 2015 (aged 75); Shaker Heights, Ohio, US
- Citizenship: Australian
- Education: St Joseph's College; Sydney University
- Known for: Pelvic floor reservoirs
- Awards: Cleveland Clinic Hall of Fame; U.S. National Physician of the Year
- Scientific career
- Fields: Colorectal surgery Intestinal surgery Digestive diseases
- Workplaces: Cleveland Clinic, Ohio

Victor Warren Fazio AO (2 February 1940 – 6 July 2015) was an Australian colorectal surgeon, and a leader at the Cleveland Clinic, Ohio for over 35 years. He pioneered surgical techniques and improved the quality of life for cancer patients around the world. He wrote or co-authored 13 books, contributed scientific papers to standard texts, lectured and taught younger surgeons in the United States and Australia.

== Early life and schooling ==
Born in Sydney, Fazio spent most of his childhood in Tuncurry and Taree, and was sent to school in Sydney at St. Joseph's College, Hunters Hill, following the death of his father when he was eleven years of age. His father, also named Victor Warren, had won a Distinguished Service Medal while serving with the Royal Australian Navy during World War II. The elder Fazio's second marriage to Katherine Hills produced Victor and his brother Joe. Fazio began his medical studies at the University of Sydney in 1957 and lived in a Legacy hostel for the student sons of men who had died as a result of war.

== Career ==
Fazio graduated in 1964, by which time he had played junior rugby league in the Eastern Suburbs competition, rugby for the University of Sydney, and married Carolyn Sawyer in Taree. He completed postgraduate work at St Vincent's Hospital, Sydney, lectured in anatomy at the University of New South Wales and served with the Australian surgical team at Bien Hoa during the Vietnam War.

Fazio went to the United States to hone his skills in all aspects of intestinal surgery, firstly at the Lahey Clinic Hospital in Boston, then, in 1973, to learn alongside surgeon Dr Rupert Turnbull at the Cleveland Clinic. Within a year, at the age of 35, he was Chairman of the clinic's Department of Colorectal Surgery, one of the youngest doctors to hold such a post in the United States. He held that post for 33 years. In 2008, he became Chairman of the clinic's Digestive Disease Institute.

Specialising in colon and rectal surgery, Fazio's clinical interests were Crohn's disease and ulcerative colitis; colorectal cancer; and pelvic floor reservoir procedures, created inside the body of patients who had intestines removed, to collect the body's waste. His innovative techniques allow patients to avoid the need for colostomies. He also made an international mark by developing techniques to conserve the small intestine in patients with extensive Crohn's disease.

From Paris in 1981 where he was attending a conference, Fazio conducted a number of successful long distance consultations to doctors in Rome who were operating on Pope John Paul II's serious gunshot wounds following the assassination attempt of the Pontiff.

== Accolades ==
The University of Sydney made Fazio an honorary Master of Surgery, and he was appointed an Officer of the Order of Australia in 2004.

Fazio is one of only three Australians to receive a Fellowship of the Royal Australasian College of Surgeons both by examination and by conferment of an Honorary degree. His Honorary Fellowships and Doctorates come from England, Edinburgh, Ireland and Poland, and he was inducted into the European Surgical Association in 2007.

In 2000 Fazio was the first recipient of the Cleveland Clinic's Master Clinician Award, given to one of 1500 Cleveland Clinic physicians. In 2002, he was inducted into Cleveland's Medical Hall of Fame. That same year, he was the first winner of the Al and Norma Lerner Humanitarian Award, the clinic's highest honour. The award goes to a doctor who personifies "the highest values of the medical profession, a practitioner of peerless expertise, wise mentor and valued participant in the life of the institution". Fazio was judged to be a "physician whose selfless dedication, boundless compassion and tireless work has made the most profound and singular contribution to the good of humankind." He earned The Cleveland Clinic Alumni Association's 2005 Distinguished Alumnus Award and was the clinic's Teacher of the Year twice.

The Crohn's & Colitis Foundation made him the Premier Physician. Good Housekeeping magazine named him one of the country's top cancer doctors for women; American Health said he was one of the best doctors in America. The Goodreads website recommended his Atlas of Intestinal Stomas.

In 2014 Fazio won the Lifetime Achievement honour in the US National Physician of the Year awards.

At home in Australia, Fazio and his wife Carolyn were patrons of the historical society at Tinonee, New South Wales, near Taree; and supporters of the Great Lakes Historical Society at Tuncurry.

He is responsible for training various modern colorectal surgeons, including Feza Remzi who now serves as the director of the IBD center at NYU Langone Health, and is the leading surgeon in the field of j-pouch redo procedures.

== Death ==
Fazio wife was Carolyn, and he had two sons, Victor and David, and daughter Jane. After failing health, Fazio died in Ohio on 6 July 2015. He is buried at Tinonee, New South Wales.

His younger brother Joe Fazio who predeceased him, was a rowing silver medallist for Australia at the 1968 Mexico Olympics.

Plans are proceeding to establish the Victor Fazio Centre for Inflammatory Bowel Disease at Cleveland Clinic, and surgical suites in his name for digestive disease patients.

== See also ==
- Conor P. Delaney
- John Nicholls (surgeon)
