= Kock pouch =

- Specialty: Gastroenterology

A Kock pouch is a continent pouch formed by the terminal ileum after colectomy. The procedure was detailed and first performed in 1969 by Dr. Nils Kock.

== Indications ==
Kock pouch ileostomy is indicated for patients who are unfit for ileal pouch anal anastomosis (IPAA) because the anus and anal sphincter will be removed during the operation; and patients who develop severe incontinence after IPAA.

A Kock pouch need not be created during the initial colectomy surgery.

== Details ==
The pouch has a volume of 500ml to 1000ml so that feces can be stored temporarily, and the patient does not need to carry a stoma bag. This improves the patient's quality of life. A valve is constructed by intussusception of the terminal ileum, containing the stored faeces.
