= Ostomy system =

Pouch system to collect body waste fluids

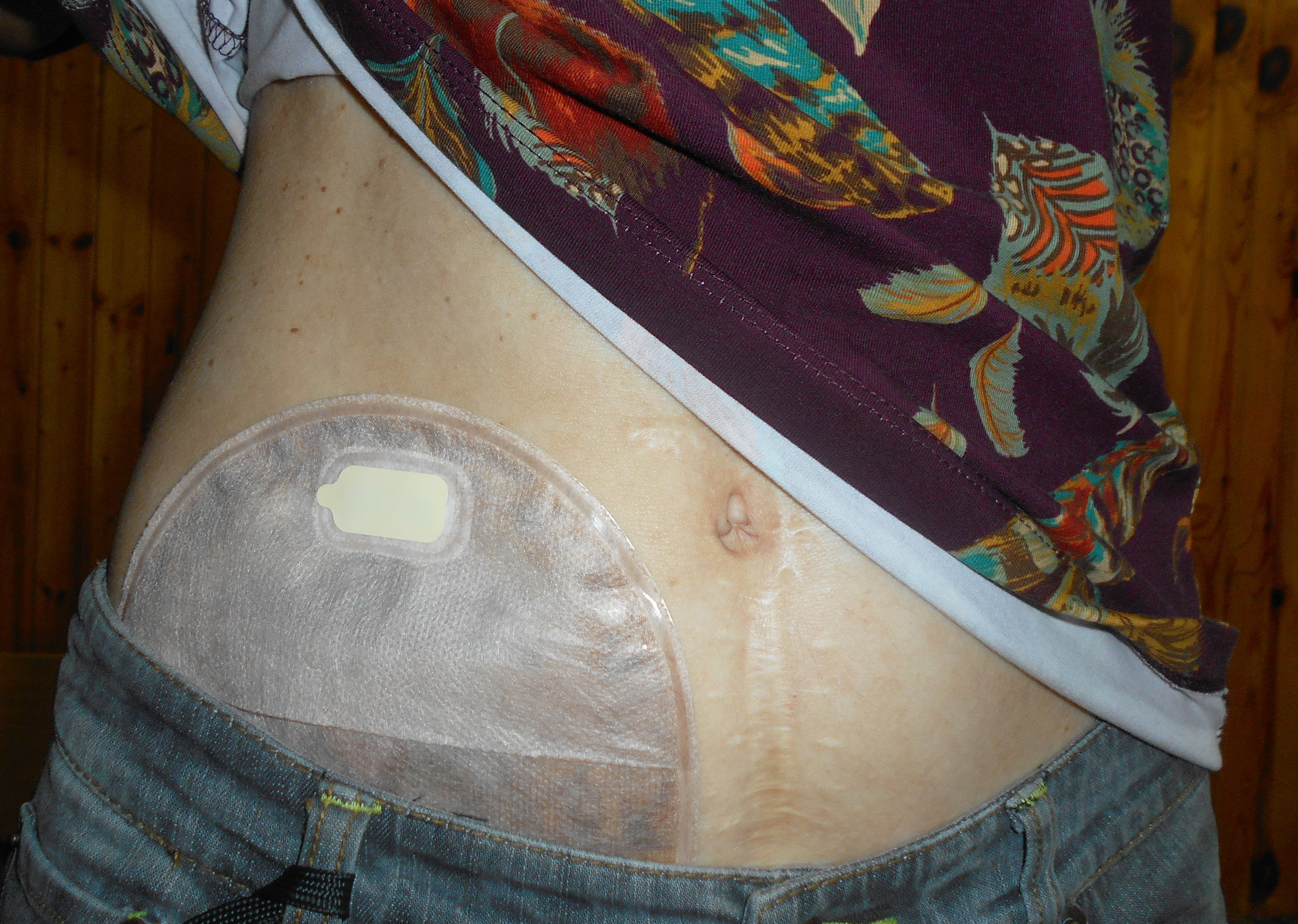
- Ostomy pouching
- Specialty: Gastroenterology

An ostomy pouching system is a prosthetic medical device that provides a means for the collection of waste from a surgically diverted biological system (colon, ileum, bladder) and the creation of a stoma. Pouching systems are most commonly associated with colostomies, ileostomies, and urostomies.

Pouching systems usually consist of a collection pouch, a barrier on the skin, and connect with the stoma itself, which is the part of the body that has been diverted to the skin. The system may be a one-piece system consisting only of a bag or, in some instances involve a device placed on the skin with a collection pouch that is attached mechanically or with an adhesive in an airtight seal, known as a two-piece system.

The system used varies between individuals and is often based on the medical reason, personal preference and lifestyle.

== Uses ==
Ostomy pouching systems collect waste that is output from a stoma. The pouching system allows the stoma to drain into a sealed collection pouch, while protecting the surrounding skin from contamination. They are used to maintain independence, so that a wearer can continue to lead an active lifestyle that can include all forms of sports and recreation.

== Surface barriers ==
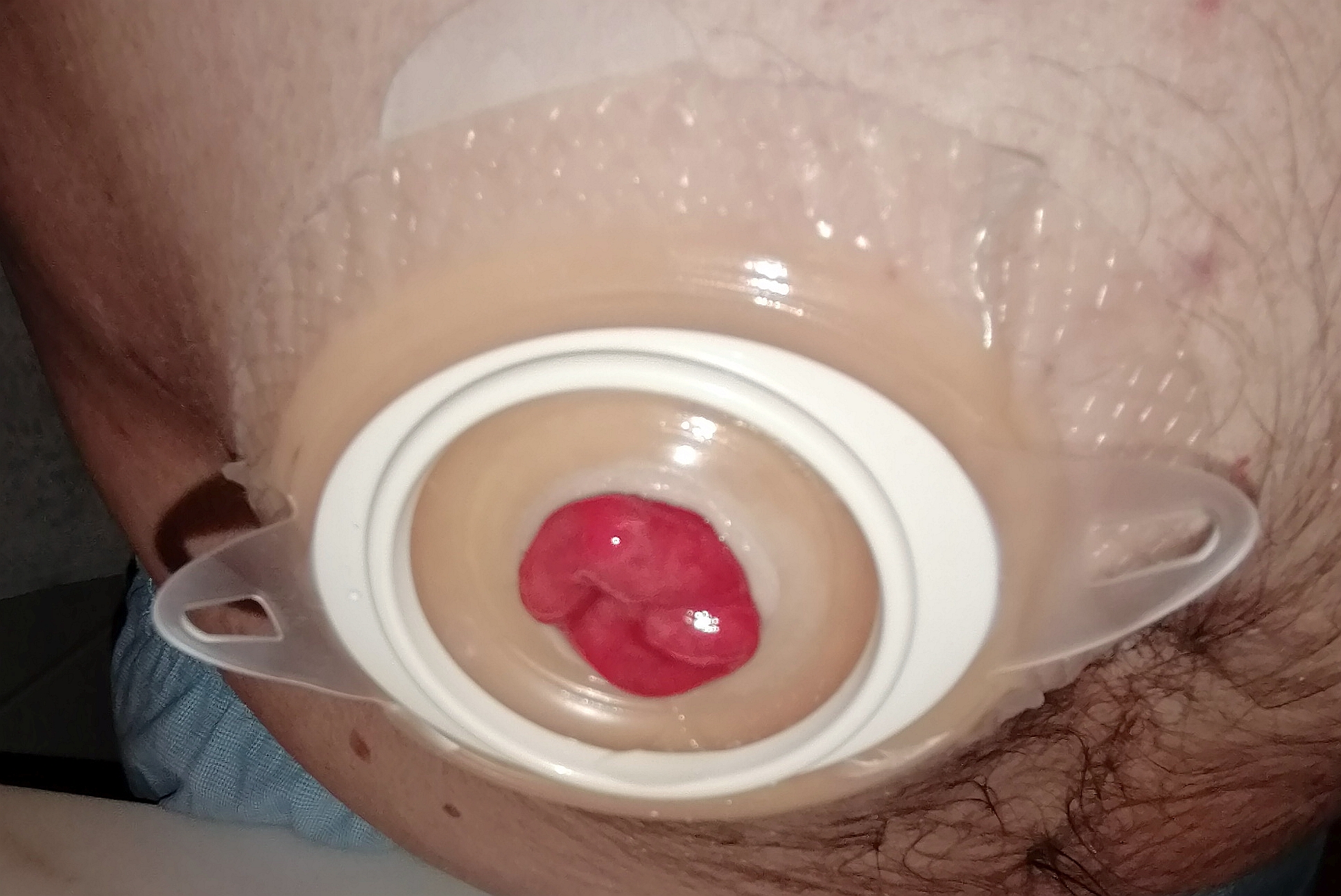
Urostoma and wafer/baseplate

Ostomy barriers sit on the skin and separate the ostomy pouch from the internal conduit. They are not always present. These barriers, also called flanges, wafers, or baseplates are manufactured using pectin or similar organic material and are available in a wide variety of sizes to accommodate a person's particular anatomy.

The internal opening must be the correct size to accommodate the individual's stoma while protecting the skin from contact with waste. The methods for sizing this opening vary depending on the type of wafer/baseplate; some pre-cut sizes are available, some users customize the opening using scissors. Since the early 2010s, manufacturers have introduced moldable wafers that can be shaped by hand without the need for scissors.

Skin adhesion for modern wafers/baseplates/flanges are optimized on all the five parameters required in an adhesive:

- absorption
- tack and adhesion
- flexibility
- erosion resistance
- ease of removal.

In addition, barriers with adhesive border can provide additional security that the system stays in place. Using a barrier film spray before applying a new flange will improve adhesion, soothe irritated skin and protect the skin from irritation.

A barrier may last between one and many days before it needs to be replaced; this is highly dependent on the individual's lifestyle, ostomy type, and anatomy.

== Pouches ==
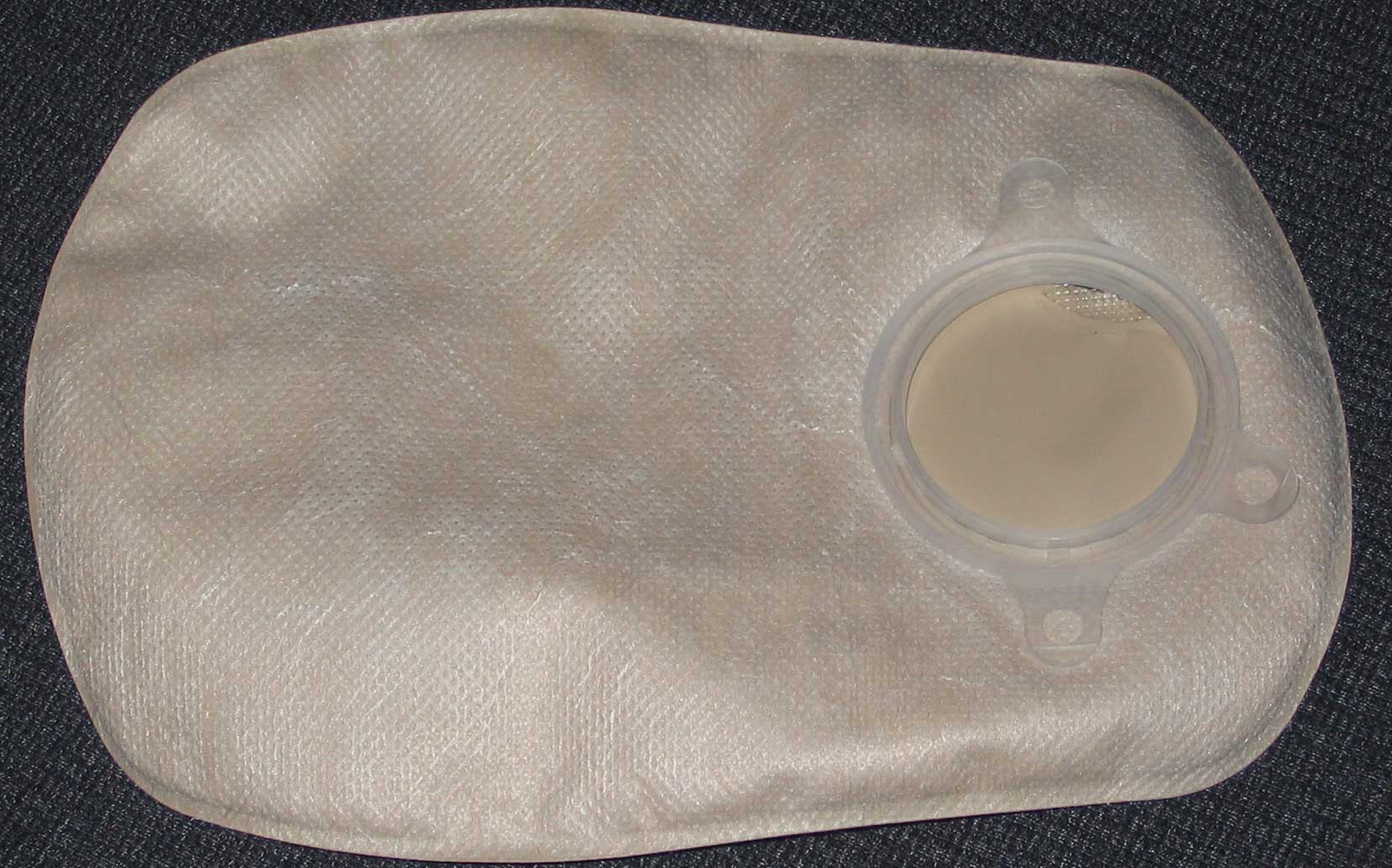
A typical ostomy pouch, in this case a closed-end or "disposable". Note the flange ring, which uses a "Tupperware" type of seal

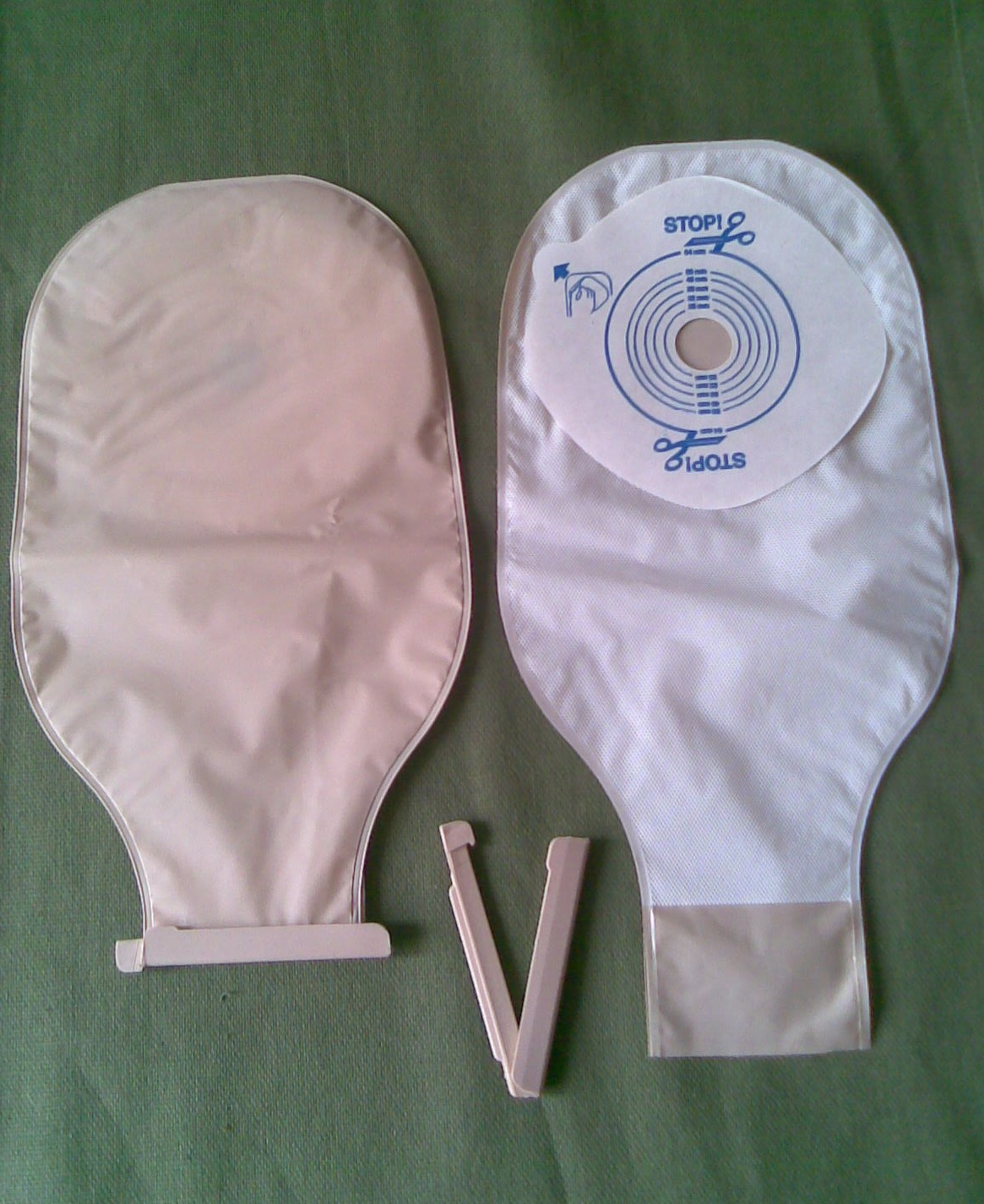
One-piece (open-end) bags

The method of attachment to the barrier varies between manufactures and includes permanent (one-piece), press-on/click ("Tupperware" type), turning locking rings and "sticky" adhesive mounts. The two-piece arrangement allows pouches to be exchanged without removing the wafer; for example, some people prefer to temporarily switch to a "mini-pouch" for swimming, intimate and other short-term activities. Mini-pouches are suitable for minimum usage only.

Pouches can be divided into two basic types: open-end (drainable) and closed-end (disposable).

- Open-end pouches have a resealable end that can be opened to drain the contents of the pouch into a toilet. The end is sealed with either a Velcro-type closure or a simple clip.
- Closed-end pouches can be removed and replaced with a new pouch once the bag is full or the pouch can be emptied and rinsed. The flange or wafer does not need to be replaced.

The use of open-end vs. closed-end pouches is dependent on the frequency in which an individual needs to empty the contents, as well as economics.

Gas is created during digestion, and an airtight pouch will collect this and inflate. To prevent this some pouches are available with special charcoal filtered vents that will allow the gas to escape, and prevent ballooning at night. Some odor can be expelled through the charcoal filter especially if sufficient deodorant is not used in the pouch.

Pouch covers are helpful to disguise the plastic pouch when it is exposed when reaching or other physical activity. These are usually made of cloth and can be decorative or plain to blend in with clothing. Various sources stock sizes for most manufacturers pouches. There are flexible elastic pouch belts available for extreme physical activity but some of these require the pouch to be worn sideways so it does not fill properly and the tight fit causes pancaking of the effluent.

== Routine care ==
People with colostomies must wear an ostomy pouching system to collect intestinal waste. Ordinarily the pouch must be emptied or changed a couple of times a day depending on the frequency of activity; in general the further from the anus (i.e., the further 'up' the intestinal tract) the ostomy is located the greater the output and more frequent the need to empty or change the pouch.

People with colostomies who have ostomies of the sigmoid colon or descending colon may have the option of irrigation, which allows for the person to not wear a pouch, but rather just a gauze cap over the stoma, and to schedule irrigation for times that are convenient. To irrigate, a catheter is placed inside the stoma, and flushed with water, which allows the feces to come out of the body into an irrigation sleeve. Most colostomates irrigate once a day or every other day, though this depends on the person, their food intake, and their health.

== Impact ==
Ostomy systems often take some time for a person to adjust to, including requiring time to learn how to use them and change the pouch, as well as psychologically adjust. The time taken to adjust may last for more than a year.

Because of embarrassment or stigma associated with an ostomy system, a person who has an ostomy system can experience social isolation, depression, and change in sexual function as well as physical complications such as weight change. A 2016 systematic review of quality of life in colorectal cancer ostomates identified psychological distress, body image concerns, and limitations in social activities as the most commonly reported problems affecting overall well-being. In various online ostomy groups and ostomy societies, ostomates share their experiences and help each other. One of the largest is MeetAnOstoMate, a community where people with similar experiences share information, ask questions, and receive support.

== See also ==
- Elise Sørensen
