= Biological therapy for inflammatory bowel disease =

Medical treatment

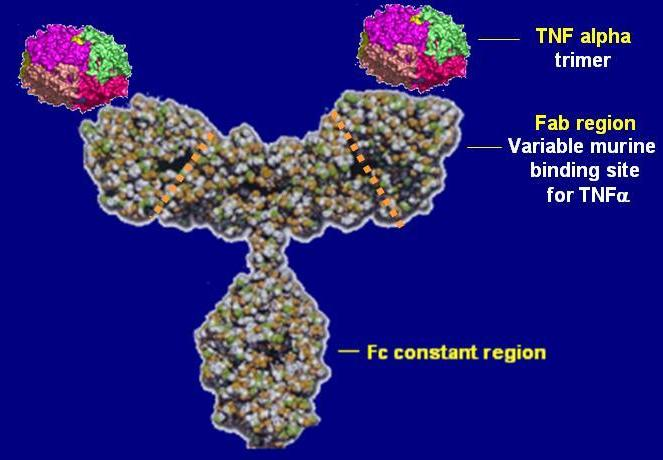
The anti-TNF-α monoclonal antibody infliximab is a major biological therapy for inflammatory bowel disease

Biological therapy, the use of medications called biopharmaceuticals or biologics that are tailored to specifically target an immune or genetic mediator of disease, plays a major role in the treatment of inflammatory bowel disease. Even for diseases of unknown cause, molecules that are involved in the disease process have been identified, and can be targeted for biological therapy. Many of these molecules, which are mainly cytokines, are directly involved in the immune system. Biological therapy has found a niche in the management of cancer, autoimmune diseases, and diseases of unknown cause that result in symptoms due to immune related mechanisms.

Inflammatory bowel disease (IBD), a collection of systemic diseases involving inflammation of the gastrointestinal tract, includes two (or three) diseases of unknown causation: ulcerative colitis, which affects only the large bowel; Crohn's disease, which can affect the entire gastrointestinal tract; and indeterminate colitis, which consists of large bowel inflammation that shows elements of both Crohn's disease and ulcerative colitis.

Although the causes of these diseases are unknown, genetic, environmental, immune, and other mechanisms have been proposed. Of these, the immune system plays a large role in the development of symptoms. Given this, a variety of biological therapies (such as TNF inhibitors and interleukin antagonists) have been developed for the treatment of these diseases. Although the use of antibodies to treat diseases can be dated back to the 1800s, biologic therapy as we know it today is a relatively new concept for the treatment of inflammatory bowel disease. The previous treatment options had many shortcomings, and the introduction of biological therapy changed the way physicians treat Crohn's disease and ulcerative colitis. Even so, biologic therapy still has its faults such as high cost and risk of side effects. A lot of research is being done in fields like biosimilars and oral delivery to address these concerns.

== History ==
The use of antibodies to treat diseases can be traced all the way back to the late 1800s with the advent of diphtheria antitoxin for the treatment of diphtheria. It wasn't until the 1900s that the newly emerging class of naturally derived medications such as sera, vaccines, and antitoxins began to be referred to as biologics. The definition for biologics and biological therapy has changed a lot since. The development of recombinant DNA technology in the 1970s shaped the modern understanding of what constitutes as biological therapy, which often does not include traditional biological substances like vaccines. Today, biological therapy most commonly refers to the use of proteins, such as monoclonal antibodies, to regulate the immune system in the treatment of disease.

In 1975, Georges J. F. Köhler and César Milstein generated the first monoclonal antibodies using their own hybridoma technology. They started the field of monoclonal antibody development and won the Nobel Prize for Medicine in 1984 for their work. Soon after, muromonab-CD3 became the first fully licensed monoclonal antibody in 1986 for its use in treating kidney transplant rejection. Since then, over 70 monoclonal antibodies have been approved by the FDA.

The advancements in biological therapy greatly changed how IBD is treated. Patients with Crohn's disease and ulcerative colitis show an increase in proinflammatory cytokines such as IL-1, IL-6, IL-8, IL-23, and TNF. In 1988, a monoclonal antibody called infliximab was discovered at New York University's School of Medicine. Infliximab works by binding to TNF, stopping its inflammatory effects. It was initially used for the treatment of Crohn's disease and it became the first FDA approved TNF inhibitor in 1998. Infliximab as well as other TNF inhibitors like adalimumab, certolizumab, and golimumab are currently the most common biologics used in the treatment of both Crohn's disease and ulcerative colitis. The other main categories of biologics that treat IBD are integrin receptor antagonists such as vedolizumab and natalizumab and interleukin antagonists like ustekinumab.

== Rationale for biological therapy ==
Cytokines involved in IBD

Prior to the development of biological therapy as a modality to treat IBD, other medications that modulate the immune system—including 5-aminosalicylates, steroids, azathioprine, and other immunosuppressants—were primarily used in treatment. Corticosteroids are effective in inducing clinical remission in patients with active IBD, but they can't be used long term due to the risk of steroid-dependence and harsh side effects. The other medications like 5-aminosalicylates and azathioprine are often used to reduce steroid use while maintaining remission, but their actual effect on the state of the disease and the need for surgery remains unknown. Patients with Crohn's disease that developed complications, including fistulae (= abnormal connections to the bowel) were treated with surgery. Patients with ulcerative colitis who do not respond to medications are still treated with colectomy (= removal of the colon).

However, basic science research showed that many cytokines were elevated in both Crohn's disease and ulcerative colitis. Crohn's disease cytokines are of the type 1 (Th1) cytokines, which include TNF-α, interleukin-2, and interferon γ. Ulcerative colitis was less conclusively linked to the production of Th2 cytokines.

TNF inhibiting biological therapies were initially used in IBD patients who weren't responding to conventional therapy. They proved to be very effective in some patients, shifting treatment goals from simply improving symptoms to actually changing the course of the disease by reversing mucosal inflammation and preventing long-term complications and surgery. Although there are strong initial responses in some patients, biologic therapies also have their downsides, and there is still a debate as to what the most effective treatment strategy is.

== TNF inhibitors ==
Schematic demonstrating infliximab structure

TNF inhibitors are commonly the first drug prescribed when a patient begins biologic therapy. They have the most extensive history of clinical evidence because they have been available the longest, are the most accessible, and are often the least expensive. Initially, it was thought that TNF inhibitors inactivate the proinflammatory cytokine by direct neutralization, but TNF signaling is a very complex process. Many recent studies suggest that TNF inhibitors may act with a more complex mechanism than simple blockade. They are all administered systemically either subcutaneously or intravenously.

=== Infliximab ===
The monoclonal antibody infliximab is a mouse-human chimeric antibody to TNF-α. The FDA approved it in 1998, making it the first approved TNF inhibitor. Infliximab has shown significant success in treating both Crohn's disease and ulcerative colitis, but it is also approved for the treatment of rheumatoid arthritis, ankylosing spondylitis, psoriatic arthritis, and plaque psoriasis.

=== Adalimumab ===
Adalimumab was approved by the FDA in 2002, becoming the first fully human monoclonal antibody to be approved. It was initially used in the treatment of rheumatoid arthritis, but it is now also used in patients with moderate-to-severe Crohn's disease and ulcerative colitis who don't respond well to conventional treatment. Adalimumab showed effectiveness in patients with Crohn's disease, but less than that of infliximab. It was the best selling drug in 2017 with sales upwards of $18 billion.

=== Certolizumab pegol ===
Certolizumab pegol is a recombinant antigen-binding fragment antibody that is attached to a 40kDa polyethylene glycol. The addition of polyethylene glycol, or PEGylation, increases bioavailability, drug stability, and plasma half-life. It was found to have efficacy over placebo medications for 10 weeks in the treatment of moderate to severe Crohn's disease in one large trial. It is not used in the treatment of ulcerative colitis, but it is used in the treatment of rheumatoid arthritis, active psoriatic arthropathy, and ankylosing spondylitis.

=== Golimumab ===
Golimumab is a fully human IgG1 monoclonal antibody that was first approved by the FDA in 2009 to treat rheumatoid arthritis. Since, it has been approved to also treat psoriatic arthritis, ankylosing spondylitis, and moderately to severely active ulcerative colitis.

== Integrin receptor antagonists ==
Integrin receptor antagonists are different than TNF inhibitors because they block transmembrane receptors called integrins instead of cytokines like TNF. Integrins mediate adhesion, signaling, and migration in many different types of cells. During active periods of disease, cell adhesion molecules on the vascular endothelium increase in response to various proinflammatory cytokines. The alpha 4 integrin on inflammatory cells interacts with these adhesion molecules to allow for migration. Integrin receptor antagonists block the interaction and prevent the migration of inflammatory cells to disease sites.

=== Natalizumab ===
Natalizumab is a humanized IgG4 monoclonal antibody that inhibits the alpha 4 integrin. It was the first integrin receptor antagonist, receiving FDA approval in 2004 for the treatment of Crohn's disease. It was approved for the treatment of multiple sclerosis as well, but there have been concerns due to reports of progressive multifocal leukoencephalopathy.

=== Vedolizumab ===
Vedolizumab is very similar to natalizumab in that it is a humanized IgG monoclonal antibody, but vedolizumab is an IgG1 that specifically blocks the alpha 4 beta 7 integrin that is located primarily on cells in the gastrointestinal tract. It is promoted as being gut specific due to the localization of alpha 4 beta 7 integrin in the gastrointestinal tract and was the first biologic to be made specifically for inflammatory bowel disease.

== Interleukin antagonists ==
Interleukins are a cytokine that play a major role in the immune system. IL-12 and IL-23 help with the activation and differentiation of natural killer cells and CD4+ T lymphocyte, both of which contribute to inflammation. Interleukin antagonists, the most recent class of biologics available for use in IBD, inhibit the action of IL-12 and IL-23 by binding to the p40 protein subunit that is found on both of these cytokines.

=== Ustekinumab ===
Ustekinumab was approved by the FDA in 2009 for the treatment of plaque psoriasis, making it the first and so far the only approved interleukin antagonist. It is also used for the treatment of Crohn's disease and psoriatic arthritis. Studies suggest that the blocking of IL-23, rather than IL-12, has the greatest effect on the therapeutic benefits of ustekinumab.

== Biosimilars ==
When the patent period of a drug ends, a generic version is usually made. With conventional small-molecule drugs, it is possible to create a generic that is exactly the same as the original because small-molecule drugs can be characterized down to a single atom. However, the structure of biologics is far more complex and can't be fully characterized with current analytical techniques. Also, the cell-based manufacturing process of biologics results in undefinable post-translational modifications. Thus, it is impossible to prove whether two biologics are exactly the same in every aspect. There are no generic versions of biologics. Instead there are biosimilars. Biosimilars are defined by the FDA as, "a biological product that is highly similar to and has no clinically meaningful differences from an existing FDA-approved reference product." Currently, the only two biologic treatments for IBD that have approved biosimilars are adalimumab and infliximab.

== Side effects and concerns ==
Biologics are known to sometimes cause harsh side effects. Currently, Biologics are only delivered systemically. They can't be delivered orally because the harsh environment of the gastrointestinal tract would breakdown the drug before it could reach the diseased tissue. Because systemic administration results in blockading the same pathway in both healthy and diseased tissue, pharmacology is exaggerated leading to many side effects such as lymphoma, infections, congestive heart failure, demyelinating disease, a lupus-like syndrome, injection site reactions, and additional systemic side effects.

Patients often wait until after other treatment options have failed to begin biological therapy because biologics are extremely expensive. One study modeled that, in the US, the average yearly cost of biological therapy for inflammatory bowel disease was around $36,000. The treatment of inflammatory bowel diseases, with an estimated direct cost of $5.9 billion annually, poses a significant economic burden on the health care system. Recently, the primary treatment cost has shifted from hospitalization to medication. The shift is due to the rising use of these expensive biologics as well as their ability to reduce the need for hospitalization.

Overtime, patients can lose response to biologics even after an initial positive response. Because biologics are foreign substances to the body, they can prompt an immunological response causing the development of anti-drug antibodies. Anti-drug antibodies can cause negative side effects, accelerate the rate of drug clearance, and reduce the therapeutic effects of the biologic. In clinical practice, less than 50% of patients who showed an initial positive response to biological therapy were in remission after one year. The development of anti-drug antibodies can be reduced by limiting any times when there is no biologic present in the body and by taking other immunosuppressants (such as thiopurines or methotrexate) in combination.

== Research ==
New biologic therapies that target both existing cellular targets (including IL-12 and IL-23) and new cellular targets are being developed. Brazikumab and risankizumab are both IL-23 specific antagonists, opposed to ustekinumab which targets both IL-12 and IL-23, that have shown efficacy in phase 2 trials for Crohn's disease. Etrolizumab is an integrin receptor antagonist that targets beta 7 integrins. Etrolizumab has shown efficacy in phase 2 trials as well. The hope is that etrolizumab can show similar efficacy to natalizumab while avoiding the specific cellular target that is believed to have caused the instances of progressive multifocal leukoencephalopathy.

Another area of research is focusing on the personalization of biological therapy. The idea is to use a specific patient's biochemical or genetic profile to predict how a patient will respond to a biological therapy. The information could help inform which class of biologics to use first. Personalized medicine is already being used in practice in the oncology field.

A lot of research is being done to develop a biologic that can be delivered orally to address the many drawbacks associated with systemic administration. The general consensus in the field is that oral delivery of biologics directly to the diseased tissue could greatly reduce side effects, the development of anti-drug antibodies, and the cost of treatment.

== See also ==
- Treatment of Crohn's disease
- Essential fatty acid interactions
