= Checkpoint inhibitor induced colitis =

- Specialty: Gastroenterology
- Symptoms: Diarrhea, abdominal pain, rectal bleeding
- Complications: Perforation, toxic megacolon
- Usual onset: ~6-7 weeks after starting checkpoint inhibitor
- Causes: Cancer immunotherapy treatment
- Risk factors: Caucasian, NSAID use, anti-CTLA4 treatment, melanoma, history of prior checkpoint inhibitor induced colitis, Faecalibacterium in fecal microbiota
- Diagnostic method: Colonoscopy, stool tests for infection
- Differential diagnosis: Infectious colitis, gastrointestinal metastases (rare)
- Prevention: None
- Treatment: Corticosteroids, infliximab, vedolizumab
- Prognosis: Associated with improved overall survival
- Frequency: 0.7 – 1.6% (anti-PD1); 5.7 – 9.1% (anti-CTLA-4); 13.6% (combination therapy)

Checkpoint inhibitor induced colitis is an inflammatory condition affecting the colon (colitis), which is caused by cancer immunotherapy (checkpoint inhibitor therapy). Symptoms typically consist of diarrhea, abdominal pain and rectal bleeding. Less commonly, nausea and vomiting may occur, which may suggest the present of gastroenteritis. The severity of diarrhea and colitis are graded based on the frequency of bowel movements and symptoms of colitis, respectively.

The gold standard for the diagnosis of checkpoint inhibitor induced colitis is colonoscopy with evaluation of the terminal ileum. However, in most cases, a flexible sigmoidoscopy is sufficient. Infection should be ruled out with stool studies, including Clostridioides difficile, bacterial culture, ova and parasites. Symptoms of upper abdominal pain, nausea or vomiting warrant evaluation with upper endoscopy.

Treatment of immune checkpoint inhibitor colitis is based on severity, as defined by the grade of diarrhea and colitis. Mild cases by managed with temporary interruption of immune checkpoint inhibitor therapy, dietary modification (low residue), and/or loperamide. More severe cases require immune suppression with corticosteroid therapy. If steroids are ineffective, infliximab may be considered. If colitis fails to improve with infliximab, then vedolizumab may be effective.

== Signs and symptoms ==
The most common symptom is diarrhea, which occurs in 92 percent of cases, followed by abdominal pain (82%) and rectal bleeding (64%). About 46% of cases include fever and 36% involve nausea and vomiting. Less often, nausea and vomiting may be present. Weight loss has been reported. Onset of diarrhea generally occurs about 6–7 weeks after starting immune checkpoint inhibitor therapy.

=== Grading colitis and diarrhea ===
The extent of diarrhea is graded based on severity, from 1 to 5. Grade 1 diarrhea is defined by an increase in the number of stools below four per day (compared with baseline). Grade 2 diarrhea is defined by an increase of 4–6 bowel movements per day. Grade 3 diarrhea is defined by an increase by 7 or more bowel movements per day. Grade 4 diarrhea involves life-threatening consequences, such as shock, whereas grade 5 results in death.

The extent of colitis is also graded based on severity, from 1 to 5. Grade 1 colitis does not result in any symptoms, while grade 2 colitis leads to abdominal pain, mucous and blood in the stools. Grade 3 colitis is defined by severe pain, peritoneal signs and ileus. Grade 4 colitis is defined by life-threatening consequences, including perforation, ischemia, necrosis, bleeding, or toxic megacolon. Grade 5 colitis results in death.

=== Complications ===
High grade colitis may lead to severe complications, including perforation, toxic megacolon and death. Bleeding may occur due to colitis. Treatment with corticosteroids may lead to infectious complications, including: urinary tract infections, C. difficile infection, and pneumonia.

== Pathophysiology ==
Immune checkpoints are important for the normal development of T regulatory cells (Tregs) in the intestine. Mice with the CTLA-4 gene removed (e.g. CTLA-4 knockout) develop severe autoimmune disease, with diffuse infiltration of T cells in multiple organs and fatal enterocolitis.

Immune checkpoint inhibitor colitis is typically characterized by either diffuse mucosal inflammation or focal active colitis with patchy crypt abscesses. Common findings of acute colitis include: intraepithelial neutrophilic infiltrates, crypt abscesses, and increased apoptotic cells within crypts. However, the histologic appearance varies, and evidence of chronic inflammation is seen in some cases, including intraepithelial lymphocytes or basal lymphocytes and crypt architecture distortion. Histologic inflammation may occur as early as 1–2 weeks after immune checkpoint inhibitor therapy, well before the onset of symptoms.

Anti-PD-1 induced colitis may lead to more CD8+ T cell inflammation, whereas Anti-CTLA4 induced colitis may involve more CD4+ T cell infiltration and higher mucosal levels of the inflammatory molecule TNF alpha.

Amongst people treated with immune checkpoint inhibitors, those with Faecalibacterium genus and other Bacillota present in the colonic flora have longer progression-free survival and overall survival. In addition, a higher rate of checkpoint inhibitor induced colitis is associated with the presence of Faecalibacterium in the fecal microbiota.

== Diagnosis ==
Colonoscopy with evaluation of the terminal ileum is the gold standard in the diagnosis of checkpoint inhibitor induced colitis. However, in most cases, a limited evaluation of the distal colon with flexible sigmoidoscopy is sufficient. Endoscopic findings may include loss of vascular pattern, erythema, edema, erosions, ulcers, exudates, granularity, and bleeding. Biopsies should be taken even in endoscopic findings are normal, as inflammation may not be immediately apparent and may only be seen on histology (microscopic colitis).

Symptoms of nausea, vomiting and epigastric pain may suggest involvement of the upper gastrointestinal tract. If present, evaluation with upper endoscopy is warranted.

There are no stool tests or blood tests specific for checkpoint inhibitor induced colitis. However, diagnostic evaluation should include ruling out infectious causes for diarrhea and colitis. Stool studies should include: Clostridioides difficile toxin, bacterial culture, ova and parasites. Testing for CMV infection should be considered. Fecal calprotectin may be helpful, and is very sensitive and specific for inflammation in the intestines. Elevations in fecal calprotectin correlate with the extent of intestinal inflammation.

Computed tomography (CT) imaging may show evidence of colitis, though the sensitivity is relatively low (50%). Free air in the peritoneum indicates bowel perforation. Abdominal imaging may be necessary to rule out toxic megacolon or perforation.

Though rare, gastrointestinal metastases should be considered as a cause of symptoms.

== Treatment ==
Treatment varies depending on the severity of disease. For mild disease, supportive care may be sufficient, including loperamide and a low residue or bland diet. For more severe disease, the immune checkpoint inhibitor should be discontinued. Corticosteroid therapy is used to decrease inflammation, at a dose of roughly prednisone 1–2 mg per kg of body weight per day. In cases that do not respond to corticosteroid therapy, infliximab may be used. For cases that fail to respond to infliximab, or where infliximab is contraindicated, vedolizumab may be used. Overall, response rates from treatment are 59% for corticosteroids, 81% for infliximab, and 85% for vedolizumab.

Surgery with resection of the colon (colectomy) is necessary in some instances, particularly if severe complications occur, such as perforation or toxic megacolon.

Fecal calprotectin, a stool test and marker of inflammation, may be used to follow improvement in colitis.

== Epidemiology ==
The prevalence of checkpoint inhibitor induced colitis varies depending on the regimen of immunotherapy. The incidence is 0.7 – 1.6% for anti-programmed cell death protein 1 (PD1) agents, 5.7 – 9.1% for anti-cytotoxic T-lymphocyte associated protein 4 (CTLA-4), and about 13.6% for combination therapy. The risk associated with ipilimumab is dose dependent, such that higher doses are associated with higher rates of colitis. However, other agents (nivolumab and pembrolizumab) are not associated with a dose dependent effect on the risk of immune mediated colitis.

Risk factors for immune mediated colitis include Caucasian race, treatment with an anti-CTLA4 based regimen, melanoma as cancer type, nonsteroidal anti-inflammatory drug (NSAID) use, and a prior history of checkpoint inhibitor induced colitis.

== See also ==
- Immunotherapy
