= Management of Crohn's disease =

- Specialty: Gastroenterology

Management of Crohn's disease involves first treating the acute symptoms of the disease, then maintaining remission. Since Crohn's disease is an immune system condition, it cannot be cured by medication or surgery. Treatment initially involves the use of medications to eliminate infections (generally antibiotics) and reduce inflammation (generally aminosalicylate anti-inflammatory drugs and corticosteroids). Surgery may be required for complications such as obstructions, fistulae, abscesses, or if the disease does not respond to drugs within a reasonable time. However, surgery cannot cure Crohn's disease. This involves removing the affected part of the intestine and reconnecting the healthy sections. However, the disease often returns even after surgery.

Once remission is induced, the goal of treatment becomes maintenance of remission: avoiding the return of active disease, or "flares". Because of side effects, the prolonged use of corticosteroids is avoided. Although some people are able to maintain remission spontaneously, many require immunosuppressive drugs.

== Aminosalicylates ==
5-ASA compounds, such as mesalazine and sulfasalazine, have shown to be of very little efficacy in the treatment of Crohn's disease, either for induction or for maintenance of remission. Current guidelines do not advise the use of 5-ASA compounds in Crohn's disease.

== Corticosteroids ==
Steroid enemas can be used for treatment of rectal disease symptoms.

Corticosteroids are a class of anti-inflammatory drugs used to treat moderate to severe flares of Crohn's disease. However, they are used sparingly because they can cause serious side effects, including Cushing's syndrome, mania, insomnia, hypertension, high blood glucose, osteoporosis, and avascular necrosis of long bones. Corticosteroids should not be confused with the anabolic steroids used to enhance athletic performance.

The most commonly prescribed oral steroid is prednisone, which is typically dosed at 0.5 mg/kg for induction of remission in Crohn's disease. Intravenous steroids, administered in a hospital setting, are used when oral steroids do not work or cannot be taken. Because corticosteroids reduce the body's ability to fight infection, care must be taken to ensure that there is no active infection, particularly an intra-abdominal abscess, before the initiation of steroids.

Another oral corticosteroid, budesonide (trade name Entocort), has limited absorption and a high level of first-pass metabolism, meaning that lower quantities of the drug enter the bloodstream. It has been shown to be useful in the treatment of mild to moderate Crohn's disease, and in maintaining remission. It is also effective when used in combination with antibiotics to treat active Crohn's disease. Budesonide is released in the ileum and right colon, and therefore has a topical effect against disease in that area.

Steroid enemas can also be used to treat symptoms in the lower colon and rectum. Hydrocortisone and budesonide liquid and foam enemas are marketed for this purpose.

== Mercaptopurine immunosuppressing drugs ==
Azathioprine, shown here in tablet form, is a first line steroid-sparing immunosuppressant.

Azathioprine and 6-mercaptopurine (6-MP) are the most commonly used immunosuppressants for maintenance therapy of Crohn's disease. They are purine anti-metabolites, meaning that they interfere with the synthesis of purines required for inflammatory cells. They have a duration of action of months (slow-acting). Both drugs are dosed at 1.5 to 2.5 mg/kg, with literature supporting the use of higher doses.

A Cochrane systematic review that included 13 randomized controlled trials, concluded that azathioprine and 6-mercaptopurine are not effective for inducing remission when a person has Crohn's disease.

Azathioprine and 6-MP may be useful for the following indications:

- Maintenance therapy with azathioprine or 6-mercaptopurine may lead people with active Crohn's to take less steroid medication. This may lower side effects related to steroid treatments.
- Fistulizing disease
- Maintenance of remission after surgery for Crohn's disease
- A combination of azathioprine and infliximab treatment may be more effective than a single dose of infliximab to induce steroid-free remission for people with active Crohn's disease.

Azathioprine treatment may lead to rare but life-threatening side effects. The rare side effects include leukopenia or pancreatitis. There may also be an increased risk of lymphoma that is associated with azathioprine or 6-mercaptopurine treatment.

Azathioprine is listed by the United States FDA as a human carcinogen. However, it confers considerably less morbidity and mortality than corticosteroids.

== Biologic therapies ==
=== Infliximab ===
Infliximab (trade name Remicade, among others) is a mouse-human chimeric antibody that targets tumor necrosis factor alpha (TNFα), a cytokine in the inflammatory response. It is a monoclonal antibody that inhibits the pro-inflammatory cytokine TNFα. It is administered intravenously and dosed per weight starting at 5 mg/kg and increasing according to character of disease.

Infliximab has found utility as follows:

- Induction and maintenance of remission for people with Crohn's disease
- Maintenance for fistulizing Crohn's disease

Side effects of infliximab, like other immunosuppressants of the TNF class, can be serious and potentially fatal, and infliximab carries an FDA black-box warning on the label. Listed side effects include hypersensitivity and allergic reactions, risk of re-activation of tuberculosis, serum sickness, and risk of multiple sclerosis. Serious side effects also include lymphoma and severe infections.

=== Adalimumab ===
Adalimumab, like infliximab, is an antibody that targets tumor necrosis factor. It has been shown to reduce the signs and symptoms of, and is approved for treatment of, moderate to severe Crohn's disease in adults who have not responded well to conventional treatments and who have lost response to or are unable to tolerate infliximab.

Adalimumab also has a number of serious, potentially fatal, safety concerns characteristic of the anti-TNFα drugs. It, too, has a black-box warning on its FDA label. Listed potential side effects include serious and sometimes fatal blood disorders; serious infections including tuberculosis and infections caused by viruses, fungi, or bacteria; rare reports of lymphoma and solid tissue cancers; rare reports of serious liver injury; and rare reports of demyelinating central nervous system disorders; and rare reports of cardiac failure.

=== Natalizumab ===
Natalizumab is an anti-integrin monoclonal antibody that has shown utility as induction and maintenance treatment for moderate to severe Crohn's disease. Natalizumab may be appropriate in patients who do not respond to medications that block tumor necrosis factor-alpha, such as infliximab.

In January 2008, the FDA approved natalizumab for both induction of remission and maintenance of remission for moderate to severe Crohn's disease.

A total of 3 large randomized controlled trials have demonstrated that natalizumab is effective in increasing rates of remission and maintaining symptom-free status in patients with Crohn's disease.

Natalizumab has also been linked to PML (though only when used in combination with interferon beta-1a). The label also recommends monitoring of liver enzymes due to concerns over possible damage or failure.

Also associated with a rare but serious risk of multifocal leukoencephalopathy (brain infection leading to death or severe disability). Therefore, a specific program exists in which prescribers must be enrolled, CD-TOUCH (Crohn's Disease-Tysabri Outreach Unified Commitment to Health) Prescribing Program.

=== Ustekinumab ===
Ustekinumab (CNTO 1275) is a monoclonal antibody that suppresses cytokines IL-12 and IL-23. Originally designed to treat psoriasis, ustekinumab was approved by the FDA for the treatment of Crohn's disease in 2016. Evidence from eight quality randomized control trials suggest that ustekinumab is effective for induction of clinical remission and clinical improvement in patients with moderate to severe Crohn's disease. Based on these studies, ustekinumab appears to be safe, but the implications of longer-term drug administration needs to be studied.

=== Vedolizumab ===
Vedolizumab is a gut-selective, Alpha-4 Beta-7 anti-integrin, monoclonal antibody that was approved by the U.S. Food and Drug Administration (FDA) to treat Crohn's disease in 2014. It is indicated for management of moderate-to-severe, active Crohn's disease patients and it works by inhibiting the trafficking of pro-inflammatory immune cells to the site of inflammation. Evidence from three randomized control trials, including an international, multi-center, randomized, parallel-group, double-blind clinical trial, GEMINI 2 (NCT00783692), demonstrated that Vedolizumab is effective for induction and maintenance of remission in patients with active Crohn's disease.

== Surgery ==
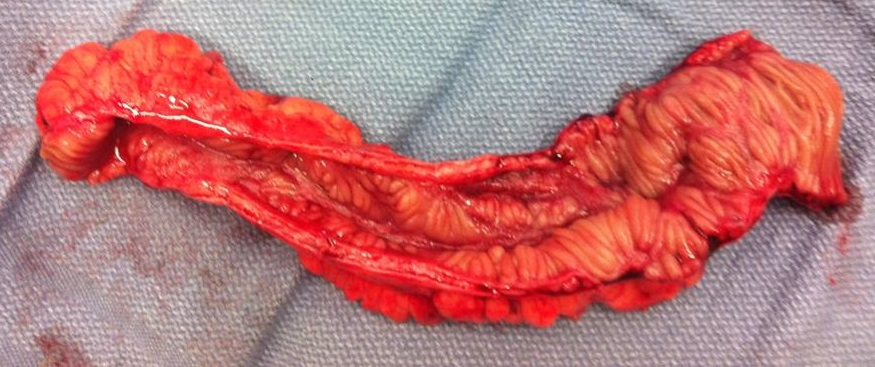
Resected ileum for Crohn's disease

Surgery is normally reserved for complications of Crohn's disease or when disease that resists treatment with drugs is confined to one location that can be removed. Surgery is often used to manage complications of Crohn's disease, including fistulae, small bowel obstruction, colon cancer, small intestine cancer and fibrostenotic strictures, when strictureplasty (expansion of the stricture) is sometimes performed. Otherwise, and for other complications, resection and anastomosis – the removal of the affected section of intestine and the rejoining of the healthy sections – is the surgery usually performed for Crohn's disease (e.g., ileocolonic resection). None of these surgeries cure or eliminate Crohn's disease, as the disease eventually comes back in healthy segments of the intestine, although when Crohn's disease recurs after surgery, it usually comes back at the site of the surgery.

Small intestine transplants are becoming less experimental, but are still mainly performed in response to short bowel syndrome due to a high rate of transplant rejection.

== Diet and lifestyle ==
Many diets have been proposed for the management of Crohn's disease, and many do improve symptoms, but none have been proven to cure the disease. The specific carbohydrate diet usually requires adjustments by patients; if a patient finds that certain foods increase or decrease symptoms, they may adjust their diet accordingly. A food diary is recommended to see what positive or negative effects particular foods have. A low residue diet may be used to reduce the volume of stools excreted daily. People with lactose intolerance due to small bowel disease may benefit from avoiding lactose-containing foods. Patients who cannot eat may be given total parenteral nutrition (TPN), a source of vitamins and nutrients.

Fish oil may be effective in reducing the chance of relapse in less severe cases.

Because the terminal ileum is the most common site of involvement and is the site for vitamin B_{12} absorption, people with Crohn's disease are at risk for B_{12} deficiency and may need supplementation. In cases with extensive small intestine involvement, the fat-soluble vitamins A, D, E and K may be deficient. Folate deficiency is a risk for patients treated with methotrexate who do not simultaneously receive folate supplementation.

Stress can influence the course of Crohn's disease. Smoking has also been associated with the disease, and smokers with Crohn's are encouraged to explore smoking cessation programs. Smoking can not only make Crohn's disease worse in people who do it, but also increase the risk of recurrence after surgery. If a Crohn's disease patient who undergoes surgery does not quit smoking, the disease is likely to recur more aggressively.

== Microbiome Modification ==
The use of oral probiotic supplements to modify the composition and behaviour of the gastrointestinal microbiome has been researched recently to understand whether it may help to improve remission rate in people with Crohn's disease. However only 2 controlled trials were available in 2020, with no clear overall evidence of higher remission nor lower adverse effects, in people with Crohn's disease receiving probiotic supplementation.

== Helminthic therapy ==
In an experimental idea called helminthic therapy, moderate hookworm infections have been demonstrated to have beneficial effects on hosts who have diseases linked to overactive immune systems. This may be explained by the hygiene hypothesis. Hookworm therapy is currently in the trial stage at the University of Nottingham. Due to the unconventional nature of this therapy, it is not widely used.

== Alternative medicine ==
More than half of people with Crohn's disease have tried complementary or alternative therapy. These include diets, probiotics, fish oil and other herbal and nutritional supplements. The benefits and risks of these therapies remain uncertain.

=== Acupuncture ===
Acupuncture is traditionally used in China to treat inflammatory bowel disease and is gaining popularity in Western society. Evidence has been put forth suggesting that acupuncture can have benefits beyond the placebo effect, improving quality of life, general well-being and a small decrease in blood-bound inflammatory markers. This study however had a very small test set and did not reach the threshold for benefit.

=== Herbal ===
- Boswellia is an ayurvedic (Indian traditional medicine) herb, used as a natural alternative to drugs. One study has found that the effectiveness of H-15 extract is not inferior to mesalazine: "Considering both safety and efficacy of Boswellia serrata extract H15, it appears to be superior over mesalazine in terms of a benefit-risk-evaluation."
- Yunnan Baiyao

== Other medications ==
- Methotrexate is a folate anti-metabolite drug that is also used for chemotherapy. It is useful in maintenance of remission for those no longer taking corticosteroids.
- The antibiotics Metronidazole and ciprofloxacin may be used to treat Crohn's disease with colonic or perianal involvement, although this usage has not been approved by the Food and Drug Administration. They are also used to treat complications, including abscesses and other infections.
- Thalidomide has shown efficacy in reversing endoscopic evidence of disease.
- Cannabis may be used to treat Crohn's disease because of its anti-inflammatory properties. Cannabis and cannabis-derived treatments may help heal the intestinal lining, and potentially reduce the need for surgery or additional medications.

Non-steroidal anti-inflammatory drugs (NSAIDs), such as ibuprofen and naproxen, can cause flares of inflammatory bowel disease in approximately 25% of patients. These flares tend to occur within one week after starting regular use of the NSAID. In contrast, acetaminophen (paracetamol) and aspirin appear to be safe. Celecoxib (Celebrex), a cox-2 inhibitor, also appears to be safe, at least in short-term studies of patients in remission and on medication for their Crohn's disease.

== Research ==
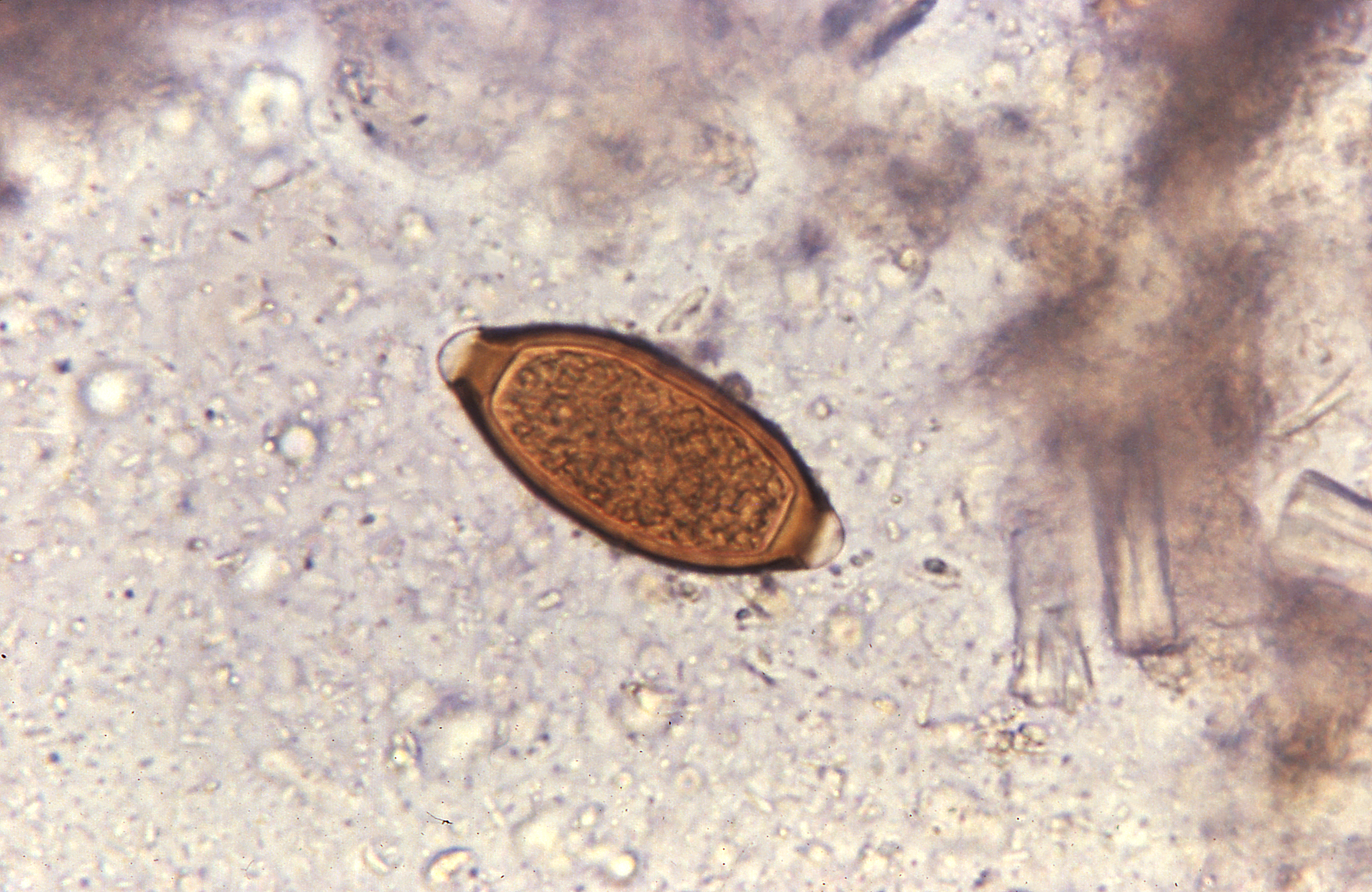
Egg of Trichuris spp. whipworm. Trichuris suis or pig whipworm has been investigated for treatment of Crohn's disease.

Many clinical trials have been recently completed or are ongoing for new therapies for Crohn's disease. They include the following:

- Certolizumab is a PEGylated Fab fragment of a humanized anti-TNFα monoclonal antibody that was found to have efficacy over placebo in one large trial.
- Traficet-EN/CCX282/GSK'786/vercirnon is a CCR9 chemokine receptor antagonist intended to modulate immune response. It failed in Phase III clinical trials, showing no improvement over a placebo.
- ABT-874 is a human anti-IL-12 monoclonal antibody being developed by Abbott Laboratories in conjunction with Cambridge Antibody Technology for the treatment of multiple autoimmune diseases, including Crohn's disease. Phase II trials showed promising results,
- Sargramostim, or granulocyte-monocyte colony stimulating factor (GM-CSF), has been shown to substantially improve health-related quality of life in pilot studies, measured by an increase in score on a 32-item IBD questionnaire. A recent Phase II trial showed that Sargramostim significantly decreased CD severity (48%, compared with 26% in the placebo group) and improved quality of life (40%, versus 19% for placebo).
- Trichuris suis is a pig whipworm that been shown in one study to improve Crohn's disease symptoms.
- Autologous stem cell transplants have also been evaluated.
- Rifabutin, clarithromycin and clofazimine are antibiotics designed to attack Mycobacterium avium subsp. paratuberculosis, which may be a cause of Crohn's disease. This treatment, called Myoconda, is being tested by Giaconda.
- A pilot study found that Low-dose naltrexone, a very inexpensive drug, helped patients with active Crohn's disease. In the study, 89% of patients exhibited a response to therapy, and 67% achieved remission within four weeks.

== See also ==
- Biological therapy for inflammatory bowel disease
- Cholestyramine (Bile acid sequestrant)
- Essential fatty acid interactions
