= Pseudopolyps =

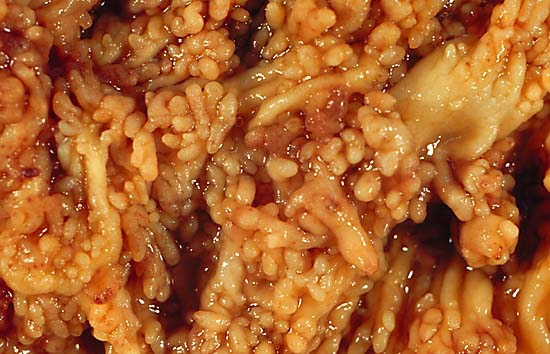
- Colonic pseudopolyps of a patient with intractable ulcerative colitis. Colectomy specimen.
- Specialty: Gastroenterology, Pathology
- Complications: Bowel obstruction
- Differential diagnosis: Familial adenomatous polyposis

Pseudopolyps are projecting masses of scar tissue that develop from granulation tissue during the healing phase in repeated cycle of ulceration (especially in inflammatory bowel disease). Inflammatory tissue without malignant potential, pseudopolyps may represent either regenerating mucosal islands between areas of ulceration, edematous polypoid tags or granulation tissue covered by epithelium. There are reported cases when localized giant pseudopolyposis resulted in intestinal obstruction.

Residual mucosal islands between ulcerated and denuded areas of mucosa may have a polypoid appearance and are referred to as pseudopolyps. Polyposis syndromes, such as familial adenomatous polyposis, could give rise to a similar appearance on imaging, although the clinical presentation would differ from that of inflammatory pseudopolyposis.

Numerous, confluent ulcerations with bulging of the edematous residual mucosa determine a cobblestone appearance at endoscopy.
