= Brazikumab =

Pharmaceutical drug

Monoclonal antibody
- Type: Whole antibody
- Source: Human
- Target: IL23

Clinical data
- Other names: MEDI2070
- ATC code: none

Identifiers
- CAS Number: 1610353-18-8
- ChemSpider: none
- UNII: 50EI9G8Q6U
- KEGG: D10912

Chemical and physical data
- Formula: C_{6410}H_{9830}N_{1718}O_{2016}S_{50}
- Molar mass: 144820.16 g·mol^{−1}

Brazikumab (INN; development code MEDI2070) is a human monoclonal antibody designed for the treatment of Crohn's disease. It targets IL-23.

This drug was developed by MedImmune, LLC.
