= Golimumab =

Pharmaceutical drug

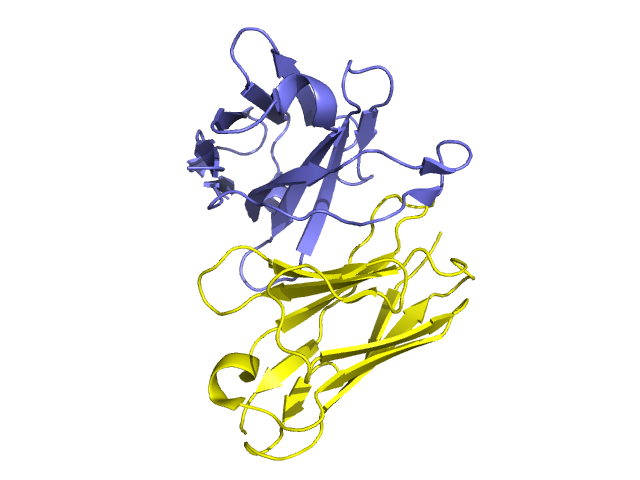
- Cartoon representation of the antibody golimumab's variable fragment. The heavy and light chain fragments are coloured blue and yellow, respectively. From PDB entry 5yoy

Monoclonal antibody
- Type: Whole antibody
- Source: Human
- Target: TNFα

Clinical data
- Trade names: Simponi, Simponi Aria
- Other names: CNTO-148
- Biosimilars: golimumab-sldi, Gobivaz, Gotenfia, Immgolis, Immgolis Intri
- AHFS/Drugs.com: Monograph
- MedlinePlus: a610010
- License data: US DailyMed: Golimumab
- Pregnancy category: AU: C
- Routes of administration: Subcutaneous
- ATC code: L04AB06 (WHO)

Legal status
- Legal status: AU: S4 (Prescription only); CA: UK: POM (Prescription only); US: ℞-only; EU: Rx-only

Identifiers
- CAS Number: 476181-74-5
- DrugBank: DB06674
- ChemSpider: none
- UNII: 91X1KLU43E
- KEGG: D04358
- ChEMBL: ChEMBL1201833
- ECHA InfoCard: 100.226.360

Chemical and physical data
- Formula: C_{6530}H_{10068}N_{1752}O_{2026}S_{44}
- Molar mass: 146945.25 g·mol^{−1}

Golimumab, sold under the brand name Simponi, is a human monoclonal antibody which is used as an immunosuppressive medication. Golimumab targets tumor necrosis factor alpha (TNF-alpha), a pro-inflammatory molecule and hence is a TNF inhibitor. Reduction in C-reactive protein (CRP) levels, interleukin (IL)-6, intercellular adhesion molecules (ICAM)-1, matrix metalloproteinase (MMP)-3, and vascular endothelial growth factor (VEGF) levels demonstrates golimumab as an effective modulator of inflammatory markers and bone metabolism. Golimumab is given via subcutaneous injection.

Golimumab is a tumor necrosis factor alpha (TNF-a) inhibitor. Golimumab is a human monoclonal antibody that forms high affinity, stable complexes with both the soluble and transmembrane bioactive forms of human TNF-a, which prevents the binding of TNF-a to its receptors. By blocking TNF-a, golimumab reduces the inflammation and other symptoms of the diseases it is used for.

Golimumab is a therapeutic alternative on the World Health Organization's List of Essential Medicines.

== Medical uses ==
In the European Union, golimumab is indicated for the treatment of ankylosing spondylitis, non-radiographic axial spondyloarthritis, polyarticular juvenile idiopathic arthritis, psoriatic arthritis, rheumatoid arthritis, and ulcerative colitis.

In the United States, golimumab is indicated for the treatment of rheumatoid arthritis, psoriatic arthritis, ankylosing spondylitis, and ulcerative colitis.

Golimumab is approved in Canada for the treatment of adults with moderately to severely active rheumatoid arthritis, psoriatic arthritis, juvenile idiopathic arthritis, and ankylosing spondylitis.

== Adverse effects ==
The most common adverse reactions (incidence >5%) are upper respiratory tract infection, nasopharyngitis, and injection site reactions.

== Development ==
Golimumab binds to both soluble and transmembrane forms of TNFα. The antibody was isolated from a hybridoma clone produced by transgenic mice immunized with human TNFα. The golimumab-secreting clone was selected after being assayed for human light and heavy chains and TNFα-binding. The commercial product is produced in a recombinant cell line cultured by continuous perfusion.

== Society and culture ==
=== Availability ===
Golimumab was developed by Janssen Biotech, Inc. (formerly Centocor Biotech, Inc.) which also markets the product in the United States. Janssen markets golimumab in Canada, Central and South America, the Middle East, Africa and Asia Pacific. In the European Union, Russia, and Turkey, golimumab distribution rights are held by MSD (Ireland), a subsidiary of Merck & Co., Inc. In Japan, Indonesia, and Taiwan, distribution rights are held by Mitsubishi Tanabe Pharma Corporation.

=== Biosimilars ===
In September 2025, the Committee for Medicinal Products for Human Use (CHMP) of the European Medicines Agency adopted a positive opinion, recommending the granting of a marketing authorization for the medicinal product Gobivaz, intended for the treatment of rheumatoid arthritis, juvenile idiopathic arthritis, psoriatic arthritis, axial spondyloarthritis, and ulcerative colitis. The applicant for this medicinal product is Advanz Pharma Limited. Gobivaz is a biosimilar medicinal product that is highly similar to the reference product Simponi (golimumab), which was authorized in the European Union in October 2009. Gobivaz was authorized for medical use in the European Union in November 2025.

In December 2025, the CHMP adopted a positive opinion, recommending the granting of a marketing authorization for the medicinal product Gotenfia, intended for the treatment of rheumatoid arthritis, juvenile idiopathic arthritis, psoriatic arthritis, axial spondyloarthritis, and ulcerative colitis. The applicant for this medicinal product is STADA Arzneimittel AG. Gotenfia is a biosimilar medicinal product that is highly similar to the reference product Simponi (golimumab). Gotenfia was authorized for medical use in the European Union in February 2026.

== Research ==
=== Rheumatoid arthritis ===
Large, double-blind randomized controlled trials in participants with rheumatoid arthritis have shown that golimumab in combination with methotrexate is more effective than methotrexate alone. The National Institute for Health and Care Excellence (NICE) stated that treatment with golimumab is recommended for people with rheumatoid arthritis who have failed prior TNFi treatment. In 2011, there were no reported cases of drug-induced lupus-like syndrome.
