= Toxic megacolon =

Potentially lethal large intestine emergency

- Other names: Megacolon toxicum
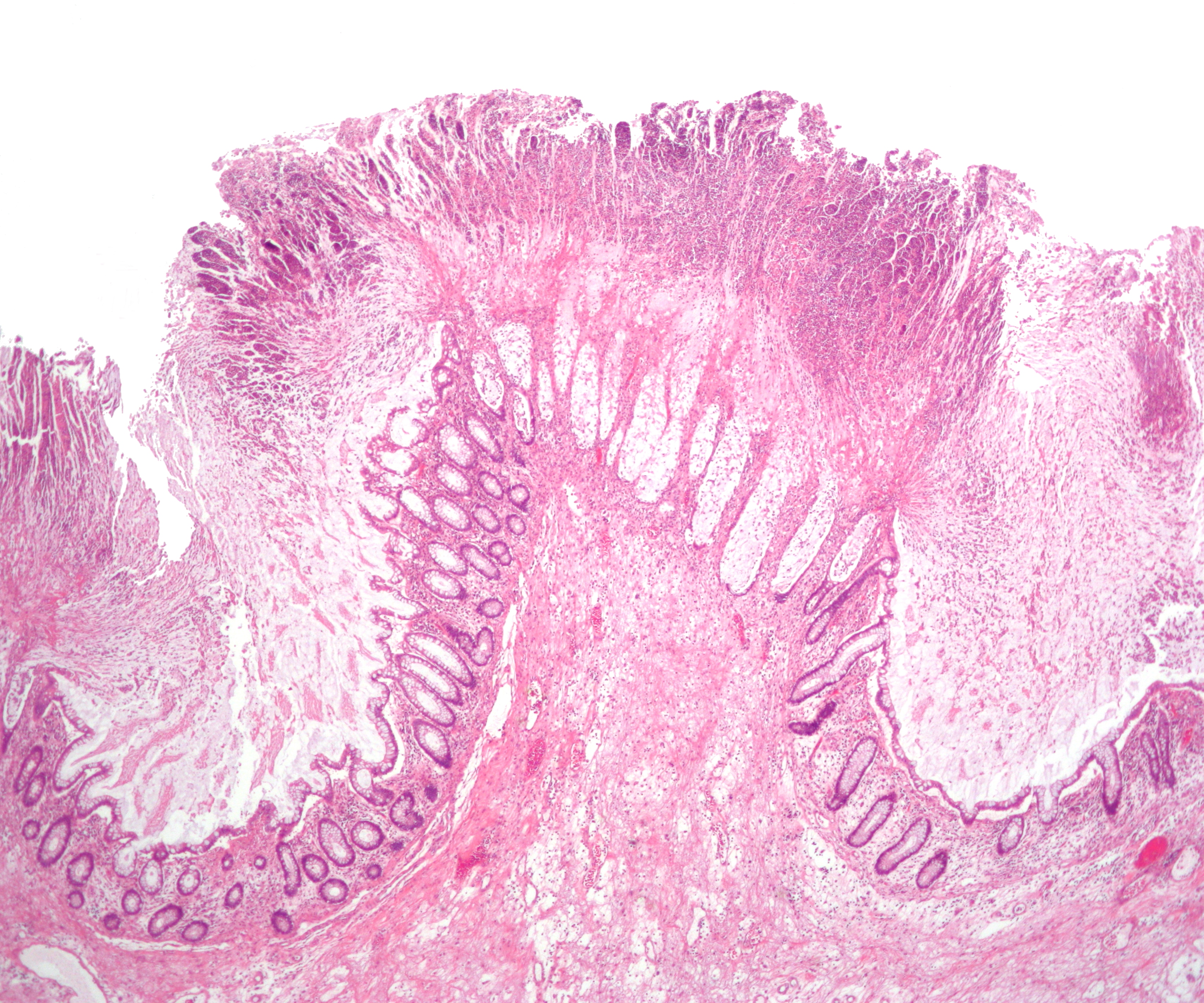
- Micrograph of pseudomembranous colitis, a cause of toxic megacolon. H&E stain.
- Specialty: Gastroenterology
- Symptoms: Abdominal distention, abdominal pain, fever, tachycardia, diarrhea.
- Complications: Ischemia, septic shock, bowel perforation
- Risk factors: Inflammatory bowel disease, infectious colitis
- Prognosis: Fatal without treatment

Toxic megacolon is an acute form of colonic distension. It is characterized by a very dilated colon (megacolon), accompanied by abdominal distention, bloating, fever, abdominal pain, and/or shock.

Toxic megacolon is usually a complication of inflammatory bowel disease, such as ulcerative colitis and, more rarely, Crohn's disease, and of some infections of the colon, including Clostridioides difficile infections, which have led to pseudomembranous colitis. Other forms of megacolon exist and can be congenital (present since birth, such as Hirschsprung's disease). It can also be caused by Entamoeba histolytica and Shigella. It may also be caused by the use of loperamide.

== Signs and symptoms ==
- Abdominal bloating
- Abdominal pain
- Abdominal tenderness
- Dehydration
- Fever
- Tachycardia (rapid heart rate)

There may be signs of septic shock. A physical examination reveals abdominal tenderness and possible loss of bowel sounds. An abdominal radiography shows colonic dilation. White blood cell count is usually elevated. Severe sepsis may present with hypothermia or leukopenia.

=== Complications ===
- Perforation of the colon
- Sepsis
- Shock

Emergency action may be required if severe abdominal pain develops, particularly if it is accompanied by fever, rapid heart rate, tenderness when the abdomen is pressed, bloody diarrhea, frequent diarrhea, or painful bowel movements.

Colonoscopy is contraindicated, as it may rupture the dilated colon resulting in peritonitis and septic shock.

=== Labs ===
Blood tests may show elevated inflammatory markers, electrolyte imbalances (hypokalemia and hypoalbuminemia), low protein, elevated WBCs, metabolic alkalosis, anemia, and signs of organ failure, but these findings are not specific to toxic megacolon and can occur in other acute gut conditions.

== Etiology ==
Toxic megacolon may result from inflammatory bowel diseases like ulcerative colitis or Crohn's, infections such as C. difficile, Salmonella, Shigella, Campylobacter, E. coli, Cytomegalovirus (CMV), and Entamoeba, or from reduced blood flow to the colon.

In patients with HIV/AIDS, CMV is the most common cause, especially in widespread infection, while Entamoeba is rare.

Triggers include ischemia, low potassium, certain medications (e.g. opioids, anticholinergics), barium enemas, and colonoscopy.

== Pathophysiology ==
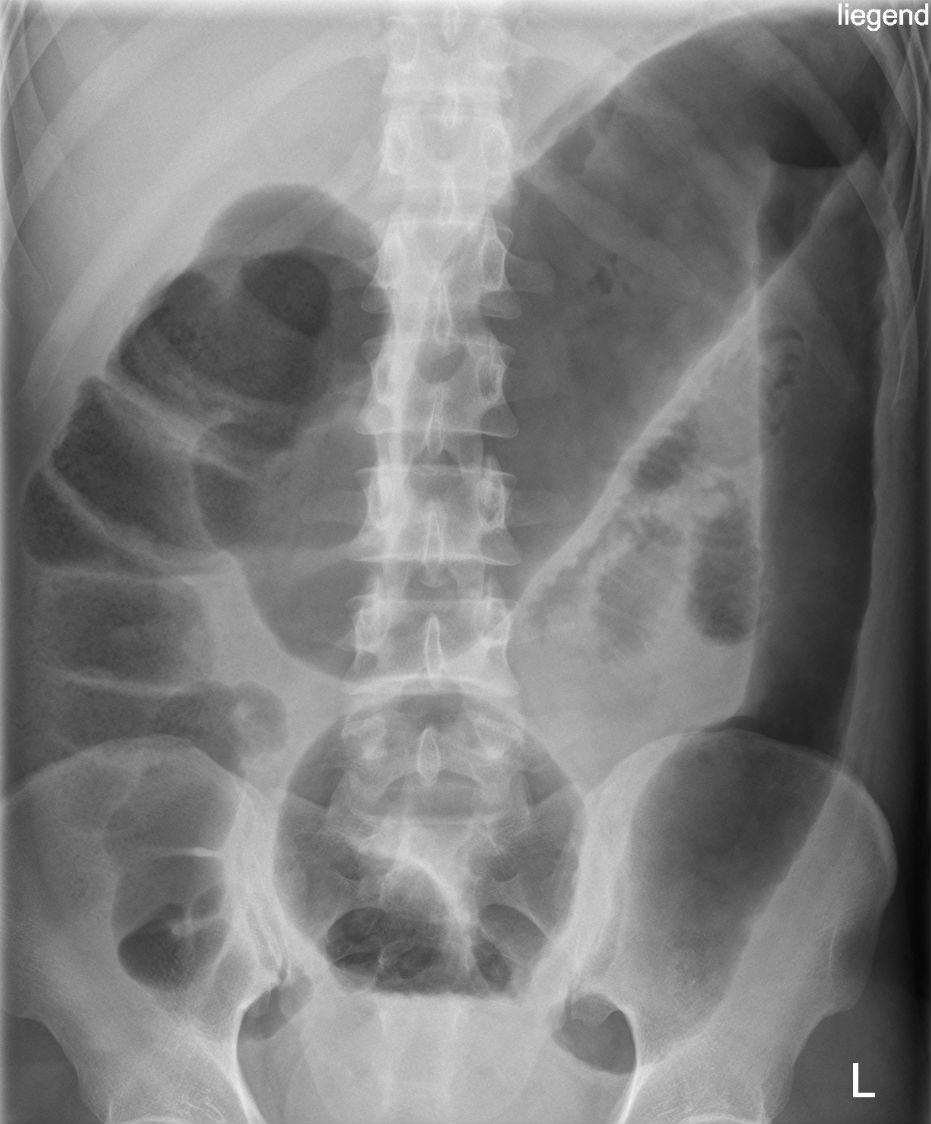
Toxic megacolon in a patient with ulcerative colitis: The patient subsequently underwent a colectomy.

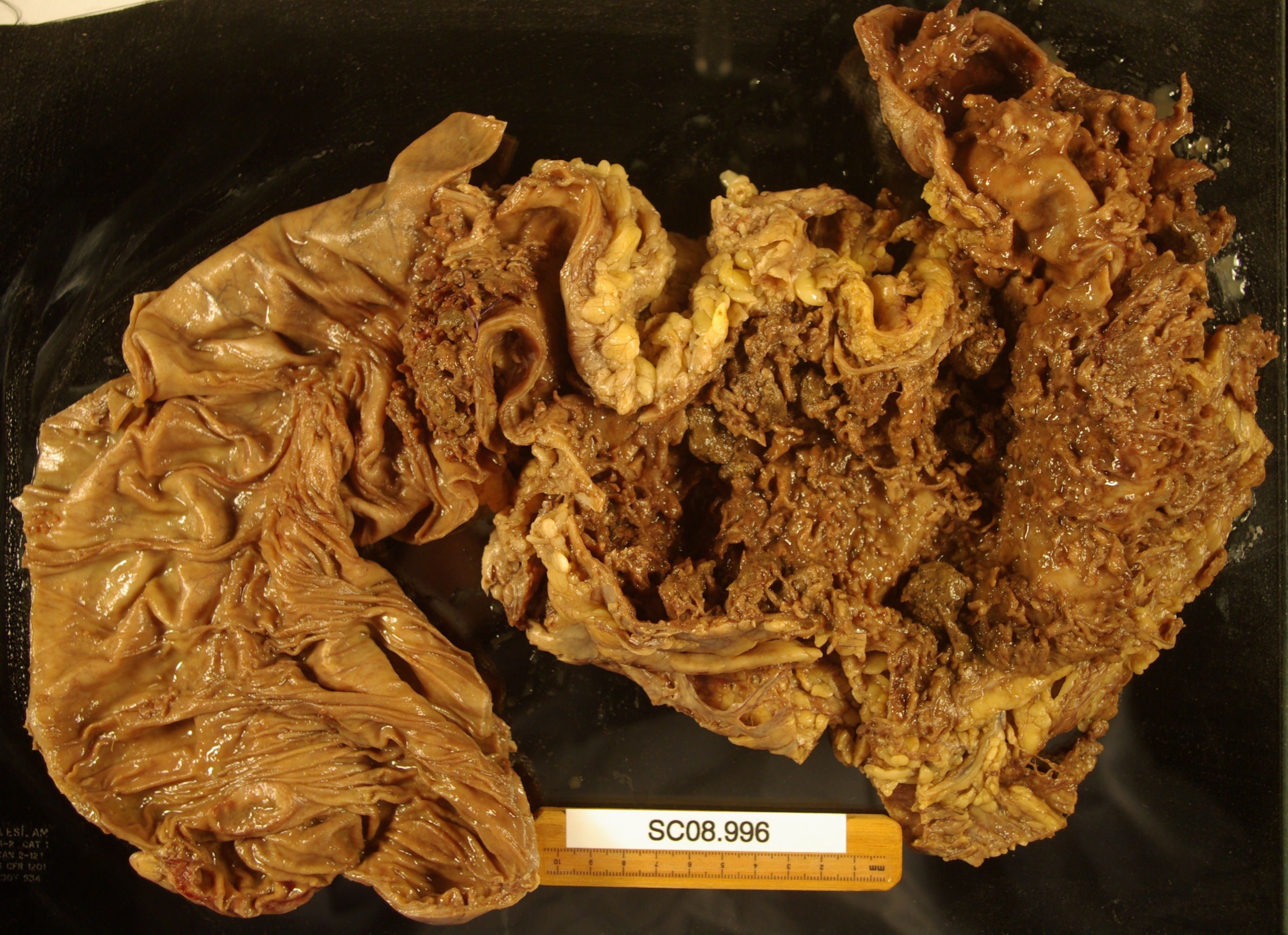
A pathological specimen showing toxic megacolon

The pathological process involves inflammation and damage to the colonic wall with unknown toxins breaking down the protective mucosal barrier and exposing the muscularis propria. There is relative destruction of the ganglion cells and swelling of the nerve fibers in the myenteric plexus, with concomitant damage to the colonic musculature. This results in almost complete paralysis of the diseased segment of the colon with loss of smooth muscle substance, tone and motility. This can lead to further complications as pressure builds up in the colon due to relative fecal stasis including sepsis, intestinal hemorrhage or free perforation and spontaneous decompression.

== Diagnosis ==
Massively dilated colon with air-fluid level can be seen on abdominal radiograph or CT scan.

To diagnose toxic megacolon (TM), the criteria include: (a) radiographic evidence of the colon being dilated to over 6 cm, especially in the transverse colon; (b) at least three of the following symptoms: fever (over 38.6°C), rapid heartbeat (over 120 beats per minute), high white blood cell count (over 10.5 × 10³/μL), or anemia; and (c) signs of severe illness like low blood pressure, dehydration, confusion, or electrolyte imbalances.

Imaging, particularly CT scans, is crucial for diagnosis and to check for complications that may need immediate surgery. X-rays are used to track the size of the colon. Common imaging findings include dilation of the transverse or right colon, mucosal ulcers, thinning of the colon wall, air-fluid levels, and pseudopolyps. Blood tests typically show high white blood cells, anemia from blood loss, metabolic alkalosis, low potassium, low albumin, and elevated markers of inflammation.

Full colonoscopy is dangerous in TM patients due to the risk of perforation. A safer option is a limited endoscopy, such as a proctoscopy or sigmoidoscopy, which helps identify conditions like inflammatory bowel disease (IBD), C. difficile, or CMV infections. However, CMV ulcers are typically found in the ascending colon, which may be missed by sigmoidoscopy.

== Treatment ==
The objective of treatment is to decompress the bowel and to prevent swallowed air from further distending the bowel. If decompression is not achieved or the patient does not improve with medical management, surgery is indicated. When surgery is required the recommended procedure is a colectomy (surgical removal of all or part of the colon) with end ileostomy. Fluid and electrolyte replacement help to prevent dehydration and shock. Use of corticosteroids may be indicated to suppress the inflammatory reaction in the colon if megacolon has resulted from active inflammatory bowel disease. Antibiotics may be given to prevent sepsis.

Patients with severe colitis should be hospitalized for further care beyond initial tests. Treatment includes IV fluids and electrolytes to prevent dehydration, blood transfusions to keep hemoglobin above 9 g/dL, low-dose heparin to prevent blood clots, nutritional support if malnourished, and IV antibiotics if infection is suspected. Medications like anticholinergics, antidiarrheals, NSAIDs, and opioids must be stopped, as they can trigger toxic megacolon or worsen the illness. Patient monitoring should include tracking bowel movements, temperature, heart rate, and frequent blood tests. Daily physical exams are necessary to check for abdominal pain or signs of worsening, with even closer monitoring for those with toxic megacolon.

In cases of IBD-related toxic megacolon, sulfasalazine or 5-ASA compounds may be used after the initial attack resolves, although evidence for their benefit during the acute phase is limited. Glucocorticoids, such as hydrocortisone or methylprednisolone, are the first-line treatment and work by reducing nitric oxide production, helping to decrease colon swelling without increasing the risk of perforation. If there is no response to steroids within three days, cyclosporine or infliximab can be considered. Cyclosporine inhibits T-cell activity to reduce inflammation but is mainly effective in ulcerative colitis and should be used cautiously in elderly or high-risk patients. Infliximab blocks TNF-α to control inflammation and is effective in steroid-resistant cases, often achieving clinical improvement within a week and promoting long-term remission.

== Prognosis ==
If the condition does not improve, the risk of death is significant. In case of poor response to conservative therapy, a colectomy is usually required. Outcomes tend to be better when surgery is performed early on. The risk of death increases significantly if the colon ruptures, with mortality reported at 40% or higher.
