= Etrolizumab =

Chemical compound

Monoclonal antibody
- Type: Whole antibody
- Source: Humanized (from rat)
- Target: β7 subunit of α4β7 and αEβ7 integrin heterodimers

Clinical data
- ATC code: none

Identifiers
- CAS Number: 1044758-60-2
- IUPHAR/BPS: 8407
- ChemSpider: none
- UNII: I2A72G2V3J
- KEGG: D09901

Chemical and physical data
- Formula: C_{6396}H_{9874}N_{1702}O_{2010}S_{42}
- Molar mass: 144119.77 g·mol^{−1}

Etrolizumab (rhuMAb Beta7) is a biopharmaceutical drug candidate being developed for the treatment of ulcerative colitis and Crohn's disease. It is a humanized monoclonal antibody against the β7 subunit of integrins α4β7 and αEβ7. Etrolizumab was developed by Genentech by engineering the FIB504 antibody to include human IgGl-heavy chain and κ-light chain frameworks; it is manufactured in CHO cells.

As of 2016, it was in phase III studies for induction and maintenance therapy in people with ulcerative colitis and Crohn's. According to data of one meta-analysis efficacy of Etrolizumab is comparable with conventional therapies such as Infliximab with less adverse events.

Phase III clinical trials produced mixed results; and, on October 14, 2020, Hoffmann-La Roche, the parent company of Genentech, abandoned further efforts to develop etrolizumab for ulcerative colitis, but continued development for Crohn's disease, until disappointing trial results led to this being abandoned too in February 2022.
