= EIF-W2 protein domain =

W2
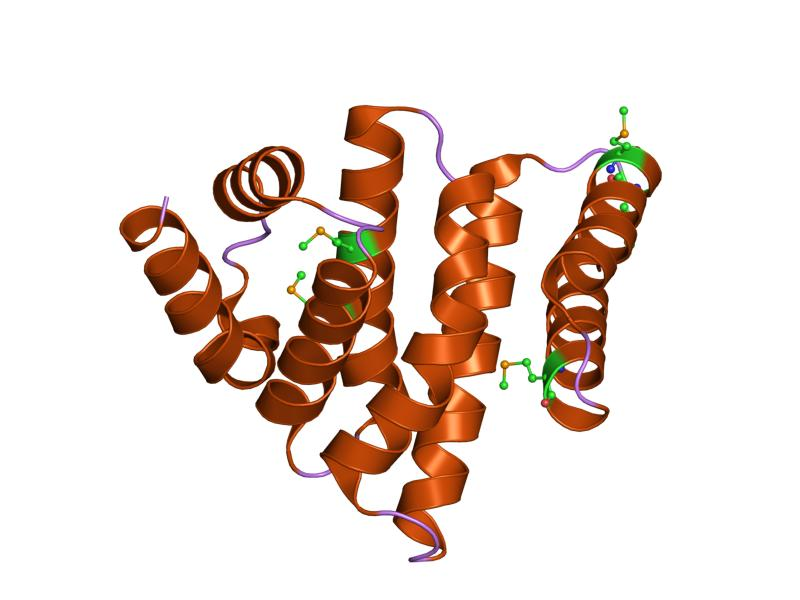
- crystal structure of the catalytic fragment of eukaryotic initiation factor 2b epsilon

Identifiers
- Symbol: W2
- Pfam: PF02020
- Pfam clan: CL0020
- InterPro: IPR003307
- SCOP2: 1paq / SCOPe / SUPFAM
Available protein structures:
- PDB: IPR003307 PF02020 (ECOD; PDBsum)
- AlphaFold: IPR003307; PF02020

In molecular biology, the protein domain eIF4-gamma/eIF5/eIF2-epsilon is a family of evolutionarily related proteins. This domain is found at the C-terminus of several translation Initiation factors. It was first detected at the very C-termini of the yeast protein GCD6, eIF-2B epsilon, and two other eukaryotic translation initiation factors, eIF-4 gamma and eIF-5 and it may be involved in the interaction of eIF-2B, eIF-4 gamma, and eIF-5 with eIF-2.

== Function ==
In molecular biology, the eIF-W2 domain functions as the binding site for Mnk eIF4E kinase, an enzyme that phosphorylates eukaryotic initiation factor 4E (eIF4E). For eIF2B-epsilon, the W2 C-terminal domain functions in guanine nucleotide exchange on eIF2. For eIF5, the W2 domain functions in mediating the multifactor complex (MFC) formation with eIF1, eIF2-GTP, eIF3 and Met-tRNAiMet. The eIF5 W2 C-terminal domain and the adjacent N-terminal linker region are responsible for the GDI activity against eIF2-GDP.

== Domain Structure ==
The W2 domain has a globular fold and is exclusively composed out of alpha-helices. The structure can be divided into a structural C-terminal core onto which the two N-terminal helices are attached. The core contains two aromatic/acidic residue-rich regions (AA boxes), important for mediating protein-protein interactions.

This entry covers the entire W2 domain, part of the TPR clan.

== Translation ==
Translation initiation is a well regulated and highly coordinated cellular process in eukaryotes, in which at least 11 eukaryotic initiation factors (eIFs) are included. These factors come together to form the pre-initiation complex.

== Eukaryotic initiation factors ==
The W2 domain (two invariant tryptophans) is a region of approximately 165 amino acids which is found in the C-terminus of the following eukaryotic initiation factors(eIFs):

- Eukaryotic translation initiation factor 2B epsilon (eIF-2B-epsilon)
- Eukaryotic translation initiation factor 4 gamma (eIF-4-gamma)
- Eukaryotic translation initiation factor 5 (eIF-5), a GTPase-activating protein (GAP) specific for eIF2

== Examples ==
Genes encoding proteins containing this domain include AAG1, BZW1, BZW2, EIF2B5, EIF4G1, EIF4G2, EIF4G3, and EIF5.
