= BZW =

BZW may refer to:

== Organizations ==
- Barclays de Zoete Wedd, now known as the Barclays Investment Bank
- Brabants-Zeeuwse Werkgeversvereniging, Brabant-Zealandic Employers association

== Science and technology ==
- Any of two basic leucine zipper and W2 domain-containing proteins (BZW):
  - BZW1
  - BZW2
- .bzw, file extension used by BZFlag

== Other ==
- Blizzard Warning (SAME code BZW), United States weather warning
- Basa-Benue language (ISO code bzw), spoken in central Nigeria
- beziehungsweise (abbrev. bzw.), German for respectively or i.e.
