= PAPA syndrome =

Genetic disorder in humans

- Other names: Pyogenic arthritis-pyoderma gangrenosum-acne syndrome
- PAPA syndrome is inherited in an autosomal dominant pattern.

PAPA syndrome is a rare genetic disorder characterised by its effects on skin and joints. The acronym PAPA stands for pyogenic arthritis, pyoderma gangrenosum and acne.

== Signs and symptoms ==
PAPA syndrome usually begins with arthritis at a young age, with the skin changes more prominent from the time of puberty.

The arthritis is the predominant feature, noted by its juvenile onset and destructive course. Individuals often recall episodes of arthritis precipitated by a traumatic event. With repeated episodes the joints become damaged with multiple joint replacements required. Hopefully, with improved treatment options, the damage will be limited in new cases.

Pyoderma gangrenosum is variably expressed, which means that it is not always present in all individuals with the disease. It presents as poorly healing ulcers with undermined edges. Pathergy is an important feature (this term refers to the tendency of ulcers to arise at points of injury). There are reports of lesions developing at the site of a joint replacement wound, central venous line and intravenous drip insertion.

Acne affects most individuals with PAPA syndrome but to a variable degree. It is usually of a severe nodulocystic type which if untreated results in scarring.

== Genetics ==
PAPA syndrome is inherited in an autosomal dominant fashion, which means that if one parent is affected, there is a 100% chance that a child will inherit the disease from a homozygous affected parent and a 50% chance that a child will inherit the disease from an affected heterozygous parent. The responsible gene has been identified on chromosome 15. Two mutations have been found in a protein called CD2 binding protein 1 (CD2BP1). This protein is part of an inflammatory pathway associated with other autoinflammatory diseases such as familial Mediterranean fever, hyperimmunoglobulinemia D with recurrent fever, Muckle–Wells syndrome, neonatal onset multisystem inflammatory disease, and familial cold urticaria.

== Diagnosis ==
Clinical features along with the familial tendency may be enough to make a diagnosis. Genetic testing may also be used.

== Treatment ==
Acne treatment may require oral tetracycline antibiotics or isotretinoin. Treatments directed at tumor necrosis factor (TNF) (infliximab, etanercept) and interleukin-1 (anakinra) have shown a good response in resistant arthritis and pyoderma gangrenosum. Other traditional immunosuppressant treatments for arthritis or pyoderma gangrenosum may also be used.

== See also ==
- List of cutaneous conditions
- Psoriatic arthritis
- SAPHO syndrome
