= Basic leucine zipper and W2 domain-containing protein 2 =

Protein-coding gene in the species Homo sapiens

BZW2

Identifiers
- Aliases: BZW2, MST017, MSTP017, HSPC028, basic leucine zipper and W2 domains 2, 5MP1
- External IDs: MGI: 1914162; GeneCards: BZW2

Gene location (Human)
Chr.	Chromosome 7 (human)
Band	7p21.1	Start	16,646,131 bp
Band	7p21.1	End	16,706,523 bp

Gene location (Mouse)
Chr.	Chromosome 12 (mouse)
Band	12|12 A3	Start	36,141,834 bp
Band	12|12 A3	End	36,208,079 bp
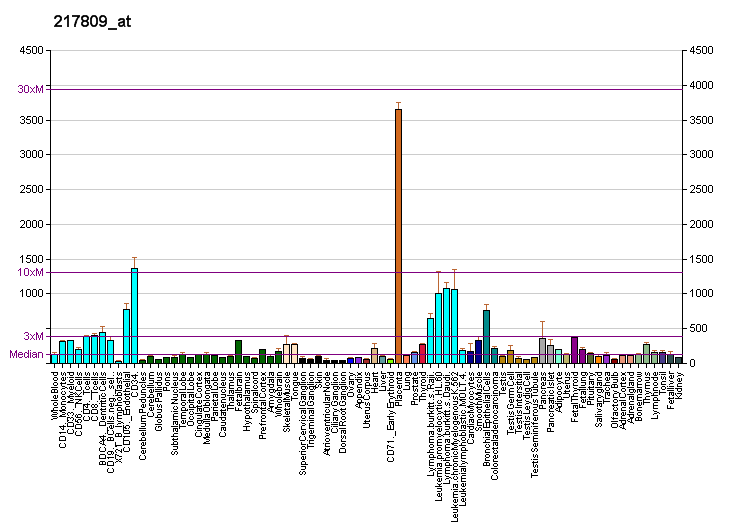
RNA expression pattern
Bgee	Human / Mouse (ortholog); Top expressed in: Skeletal muscle tissue of biceps brachii; right ventricle; Skeletal muscle tissue of rectus abdominis; triceps brachii muscle; vastus lateralis muscle; myocardium of left ventricle; placenta; glutes; body of tongue; deltoid muscle / Top expressed in: ventricular zone; genital tubercle; ganglionic eminence; embryo; epiblast; embryo; extraocular muscle; interventricular septum; plantaris muscle; muscle of thigh; More reference expression data
BioGPS	More reference expression data
Gene ontology
Molecular function	cadherin binding; protein binding
Cellular component	membrane; cytoplasm
Biological process	cell differentiation; nervous system development; multicellular organism development
Sources:Amigo / QuickGO
Orthologs
Databases	NCBI: entry; OMA: entry
Species	Human	Mouse
Entrez	28969	66912
Ensembl	ENSG00000136261	ENSMUSG00000020547
UniProt	Q9Y6E2	Q91VK1
RefSeq (mRNA)	NM_001159767; NM_014038; NM_001362717; NM_001362718; NM_001362719	NM_025840
RefSeq (protein)	NP_001153239; NP_054757; NP_001349646; NP_001349647; NP_001349648	NP_080116
Location (UCSC)	Chr 7: 16.65 – 16.71 Mb	Chr 12: 36.14 – 36.21 Mb
PubMed search
- Wikidata
View/Edit Human	View/Edit Mouse

Basic Leucine Zipper and W2 Domain-Containing Protein 2 is a protein that is encoded by the BZW2 gene. It is a eukaryotic translation factor found in species up to bacteria. In animals, it is localized in the cytoplasm and expressed ubiquitously throughout the body. The heart, placenta, skeletal muscle, and hippocampus show higher expression. In various cancers, upregulation tends to lead to higher severity and mortality. It has been found to interact with SARS-CoV-2.

== Gene ==
BZW2 is known as Basic Leucine Zipper W2 Domain-Containing Protein 2, MST017, MSTP017, 5MP1, Eukaryotic Translation Factor 5, and HSPC028. It is located on chromosome 7 at p21.1 on the plus strand. The gene spans 60,389 base pairs, at coordinates 16,583,248 – 16,804,999. There are 12 exons.

== Protein ==
There are two known isoforms of BZW2. Isoform 1 is 419 amino acids long and is the most abundant form. Isoform 2 is 225 amino acids, containing only 11 exons and a shorter N-terminus.

The coded protein is 419 amino acids long and weighs 48.3 kDa. As described in the name, the protein contains a leucine-zipper motif. Four “L……” repeats are present in the beginning, giving rise to the characteristic leucine zipper helix within the 3D structure. An eIF5C domain follows the leucine motif, which is a part of proteins that are important for strict regulation of cellular processes.

The amino acid composition of BZW2 has a higher amount of lysines and a lower amount of prolines in humans but a higher glutamic acid composition in its orthologs. The human BZW2 protein has an overall charge of -3 which can go down to -9 in orthologs. There are no significant charge clusters. There is also a KELQ repeat that has remained conserved in animals.

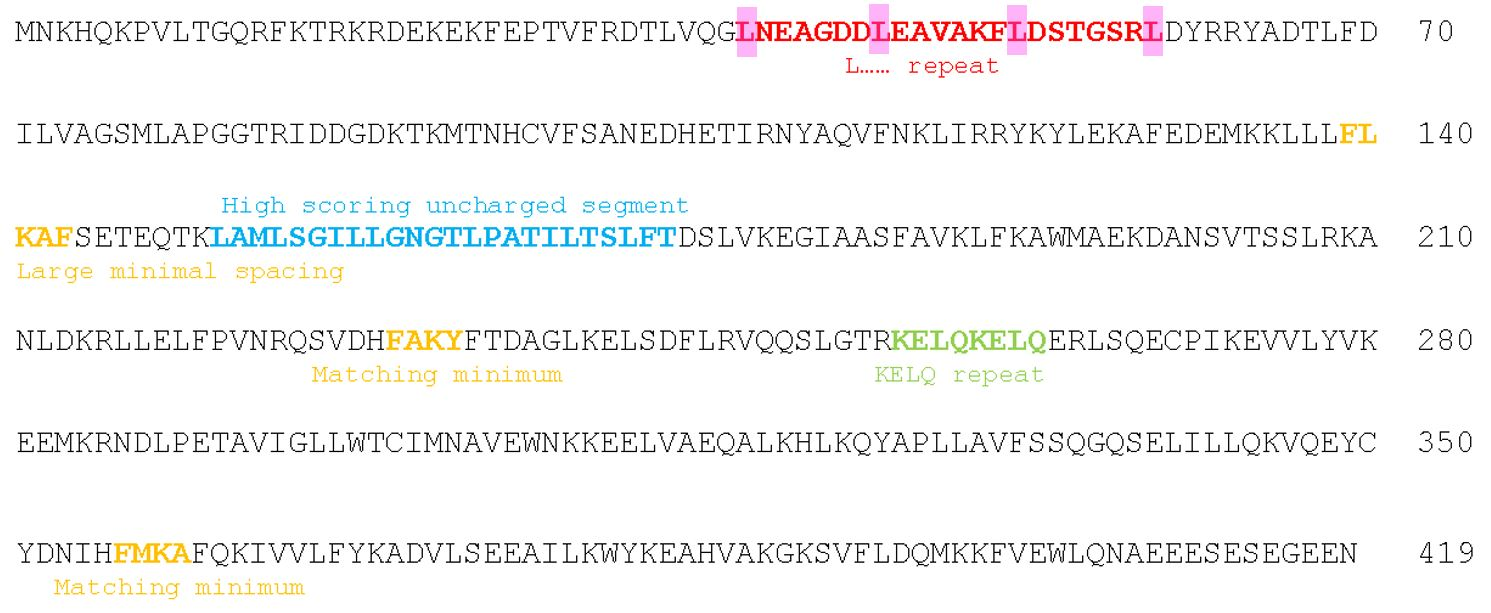
Sequence of BZW2 is shown with positions of spacing information, charge clusters, and repeats.

The secondary structure contains a majority of alpha helices. There are 19 alpha helices in all orthologs, except for two additional beta sheets which are absent in humans. The tertiary structure forms a repeated fold of alpha-helices, a structure that is conserved through bacteria.

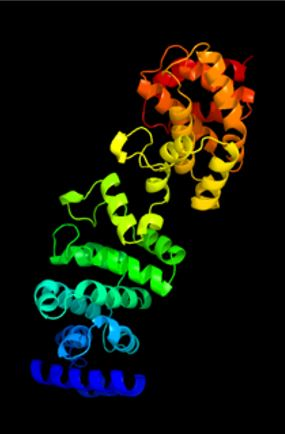
BZW2 structure from Phyre2 colored from N-terminus (red) to C-terminus (blue).

== Regulation ==
=== Gene-level ===
There are three known promoters for BZW2. It is regulated by numerous transcription factors, including an estrogen receptor transcription factor (ESR2, ES3), leucine zipper transcription factor (RRFIP1), and Y sex-determining transcription factors (SRY). With these transcription factors, BZW2 has regulated expression in organs that contribute to cellular functions. The Y sex-determining transcription factor works to regulate BZW2 expression in the testis. Throughout the body, BZW2 is ubiquitously expressed within tissues. There is elevated mRNA abundance in the heart, placenta, and skeletal muscle.

=== Transcript-level ===
There are four major stem loops in the 5’ untranslated and four in the 3’ untranslated region that function in transcript-level regulation.

=== Protein-level ===
BZW2 has multiple phosphorylation, acetylation, glycosylation, SUMOylation, and glycation sites for regulation. Since upregulation of BZW2 leads to disrupted cellular processes and severe cancer forms, post-translational modifications are needed to keep the gene highly regulated. The protein is localized within the cytoplasm and has no likely or confirmed nuclear or mitochondrial target peptides.

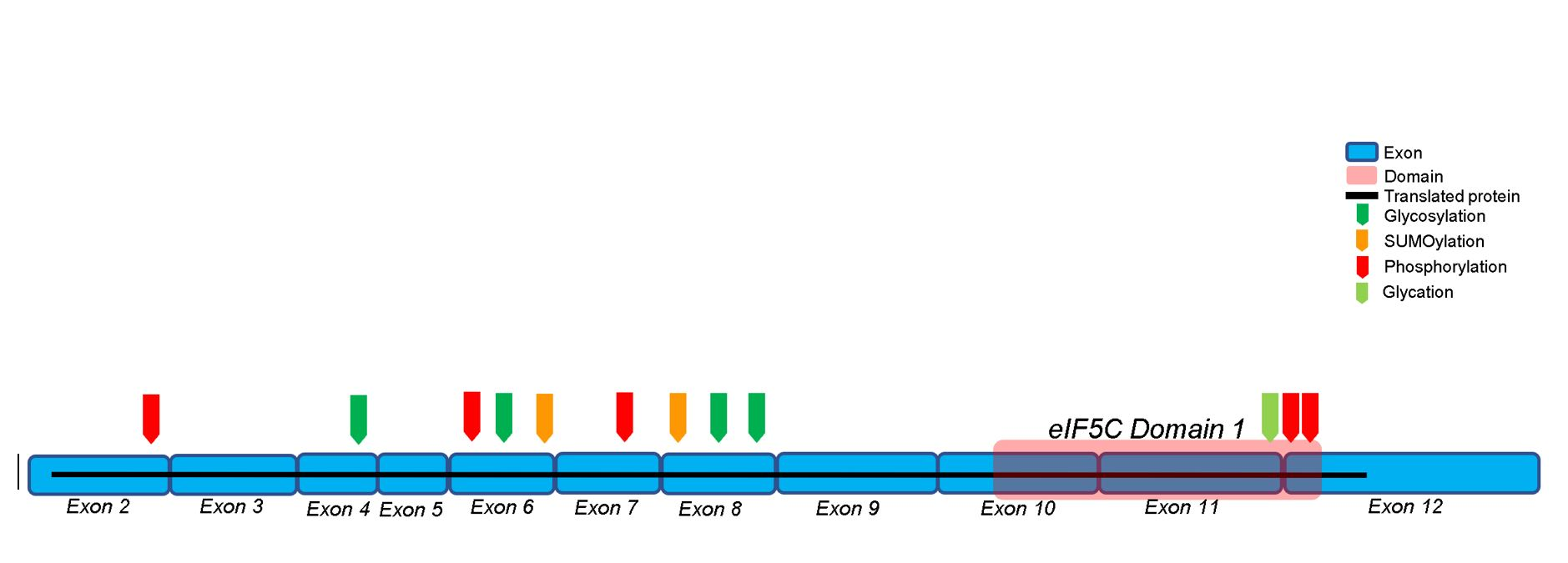
Schematic of the post-translational modification locations on the BZW2 protein.

== Evolution ==
BZW2 has a single paralog, BZW1 which is conserved up to plants. There are BZW2 orthologs up to a couple species of bacteria. The most distant ortholog was Microbacterium arborescens. BZW2 contains an eIF5C domain which is also present in eIF2BE, eIF4G, eIF5, and a GAP protein specific for eIF2.

Select BZW2 Orthologs
Species	Common name	Order	Million years since divergence from humans	Similarity %	Identity %
Homo sapiens	Human	Primates	0	100	100
Mus musculus	Mouse	Rodentia	29	100	99
Phocoena sinus	Vaquita	Artiodactyla	94	99	99
Ornithorhynchus anatinus	Duckbill platypus	Monotremata	180	97	95
Columba livia	Rock pigeon	Columbiformes	318	95	90
Pantherophis guttatus	Corn snake	Squamata	318	97	92
Terrapene Carolina triunguis	Three-toed box turtle	Testudines	318	97	92
Pygoscelis adeliae	Adelie penguin	Spehnisciformes	318	96	97
Xenopus tropicalis	Western clawed frog	Anura	419	97	90
Danio rerio	Zebrafish	Cypriniformes	433	84	95
Ambylraia radiata	Thorny skate	Raiiformes	465	96	86
Petromyzon marinus	Sea lamprey	Petromyzontiformes	599	86	73
Acanthaster planci	Crown-of-thorns starfish	Valvatida	627	69	51
Drosophila melanogaster	Fruit fly	Diptera	736	72	49
Coptotermes formosanus	Formosan termite	Blattodea	736	69	51
Gigaspora rosea	NA	Diversisporales	1017	62	38
Rhizophagus irregularis	NA	Glomerales	1017	62	38
Camellia sinensis	Tea plant	Ericales	1275	55	35
Rhodamnia argentea	Malletwood	Myrtales	1275	69	47
Microbacterium arborescens	NA	Actinomycetales	4090	30	20
Leptospira ognonensis	NA	Leptospirales	4090	51	37
Aeromonas veronii	NA	Aeromondales	4090	87	69

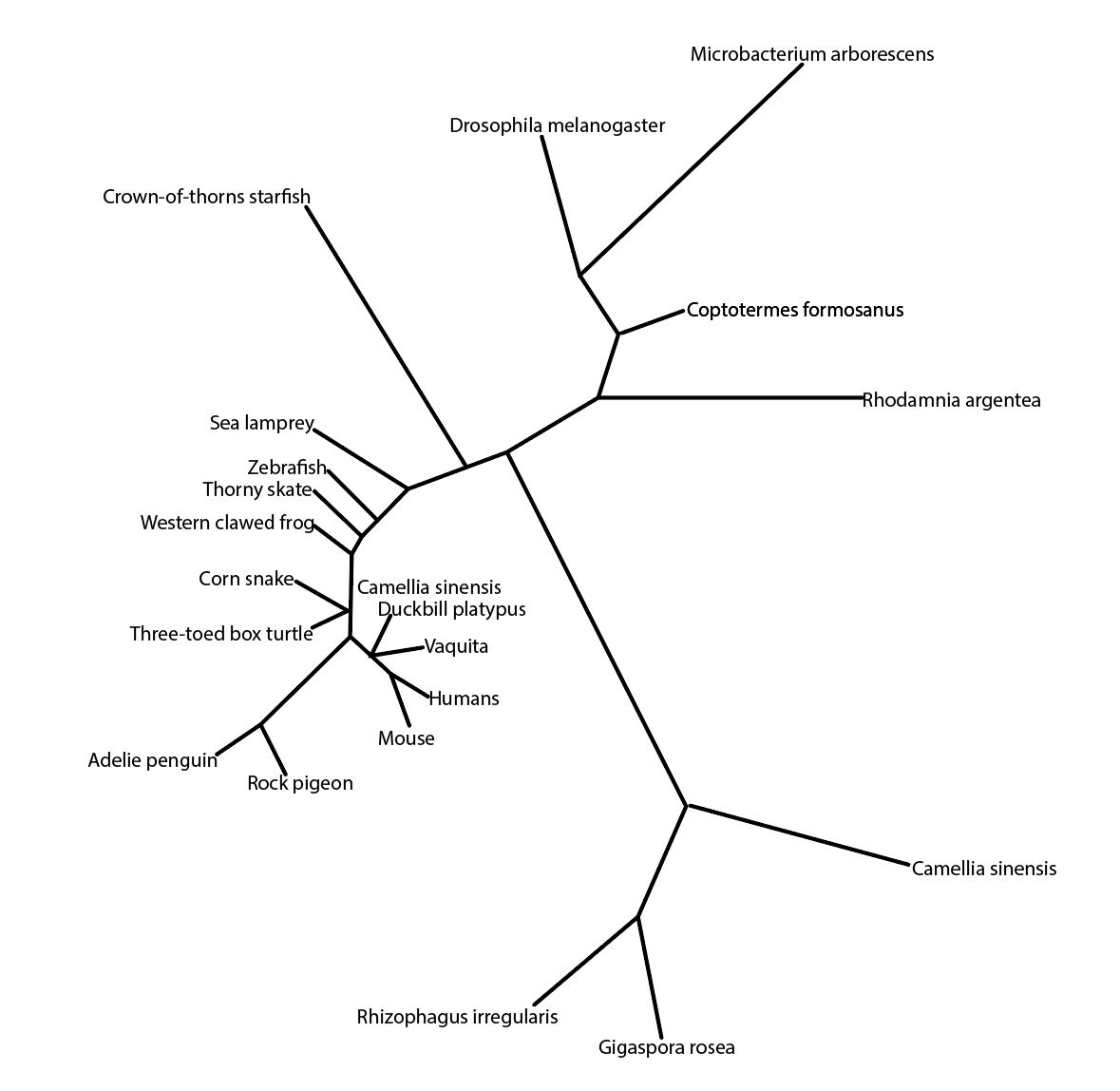
A phylogenetic tree illustrates the BZW2 sequence relationships between orthologs.

Compared to Cytochrome C, a quickly diverging protein, and Fibrinogen, a slowly diverging protein, BZW2 has had slow corrected divergence over time, illustrating conservation and protein importance.

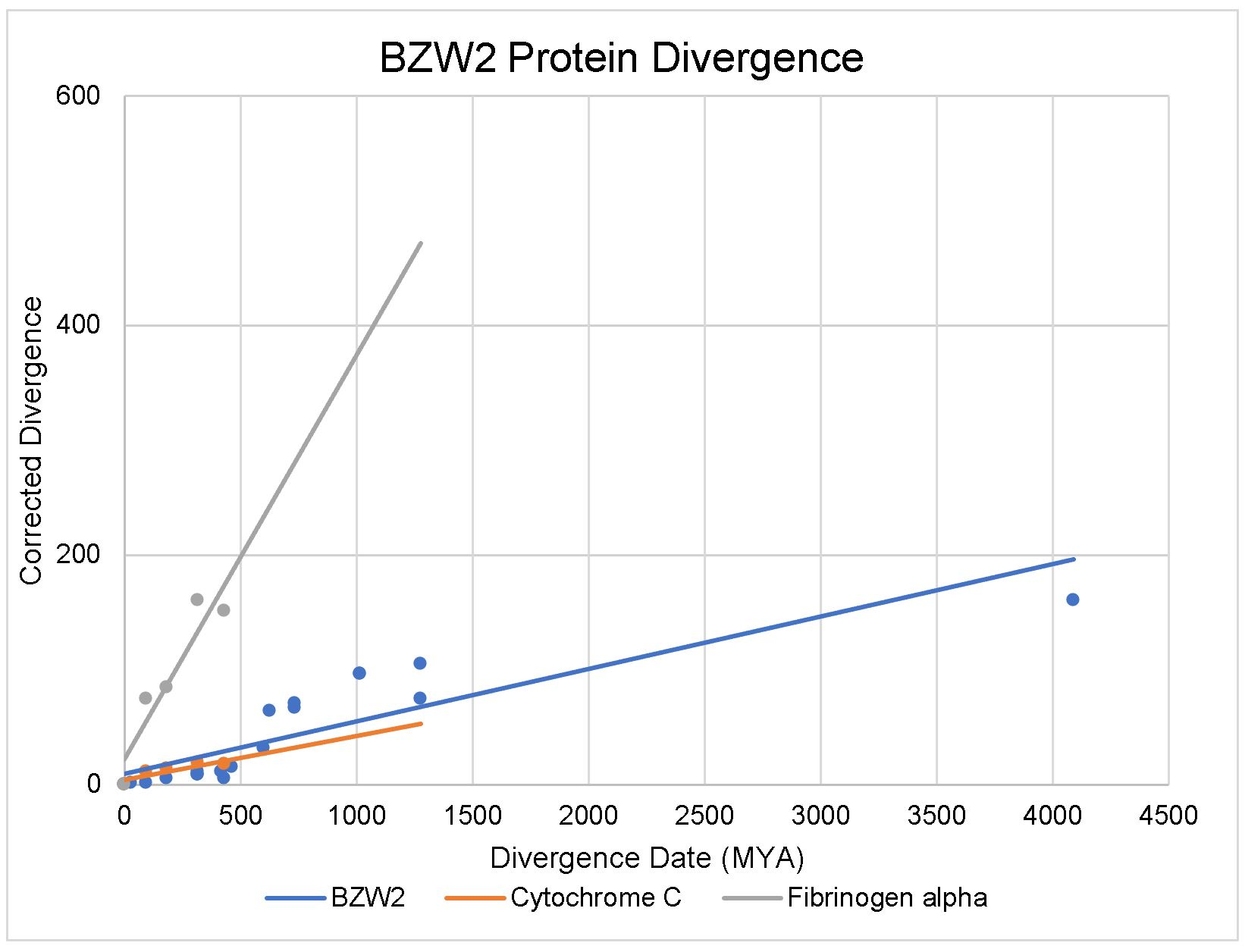
BZW2 corrected divergence over million years diverged from humans,

== Interactions ==
BZW2 is known to interact with:

- BZW1
- EIF2S2
- PSTPIP1
- NEK4
- ORF4
- SNW1
- rep

EIF2S2 and ORF4 work to synthesize and replicate BZW2. PSTPIP1 and NEK4 are regulatory proteins that help in the functionality of BZW2. SNW1, a spliceosome protein, splices BZW2 mRNA variants. The protein rep is part of SARS-CoV-2 virus and inhibits translation of BZW2.

== Clinical significance ==
=== Cancer ===
BZW2 has been studied to determine its role in multiple cancers. Overall, the studies all showed that upregulation of BZW2 lead to more severe forms of cancer, higher rate of mortality, and increased likeliness of reoccurrence.

A 2019 study focused on the effect of BZW2 in colorectal cancer. It found that upregulation of BZW2 promoted tumor growth and had a downstream upregulation effect on c-Myc, a proto-oncogene. A second study from 2020 determined this upregulation also had a positive effect on the activation of the ERK/MAPK pathway.

In hepatocellular carcinoma, osteosarcoma, lung adenocarcinoma, and muscle-invasive bladder cancer, overexpression of BZW2 lead to overactivation of the AKT/mTOR signaling pathway by increasing phosphorylation of AKT and mTOR. The AKT/mTOR pathway is an important intracellular signaling pathway that regulates the cell cycle. When the pathway activity is increased, cells proliferated at a higher rate and apoptosis decreases, leading to tumor growth.

=== SARS-CoV-2 ===
BZW2 interacts with the nsp8 protein of SARS-CoV-2. nsp8 dimerizes and forms a supercomplex which works to repress the translation of BZW2.
