= CDAI =

CDAI may refer to:

- Crohn's Disease Activity Index
- Cartilage-derived angiogenesis inhibitor
