= Febrile neutrophilic dermatosis =

Skin disease

Sweet syndrome
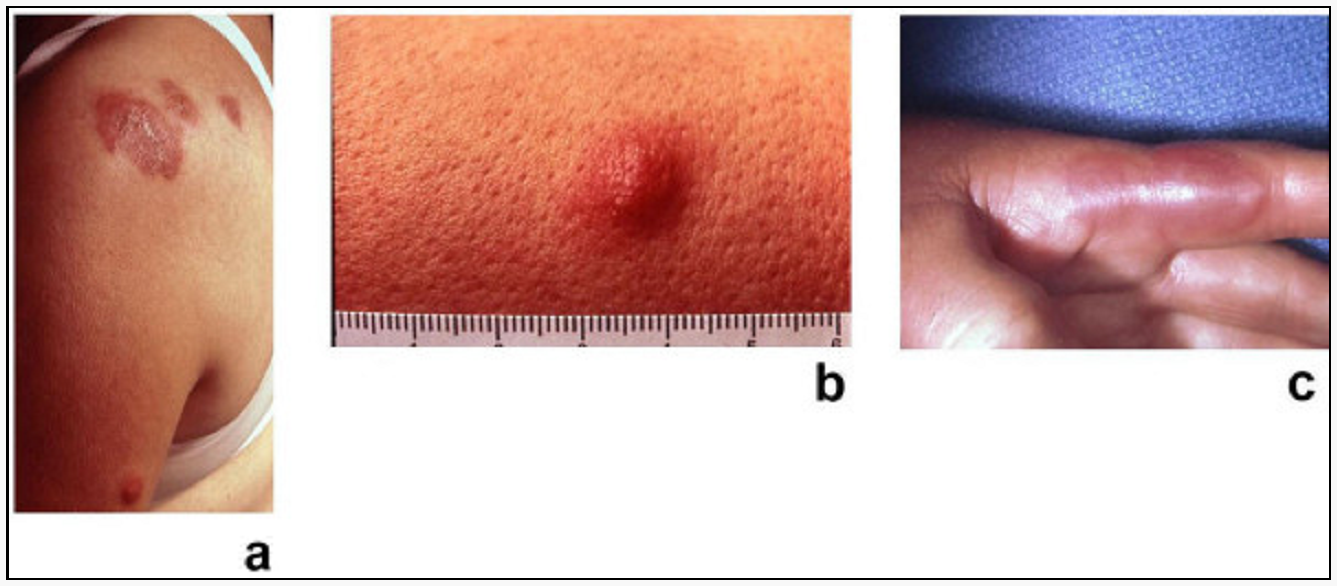
- Sweet syndrome lesions with the classical form of the dermatosis.
- Specialty: Dermatology

Sweet syndrome (SS), or acute febrile neutrophilic dermatosis, is a skin disease characterized by the sudden onset of fever, an elevated white blood cell count, and tender, red, well-demarcated papules and plaques that show dense infiltrates by neutrophil granulocytes on histologic examination.

The syndrome was first described in 1964 by Robert Douglas Sweet. It was also known as Gomm–Button disease in honour of the first two patients Sweet diagnosed with the condition.

== Signs and symptoms ==
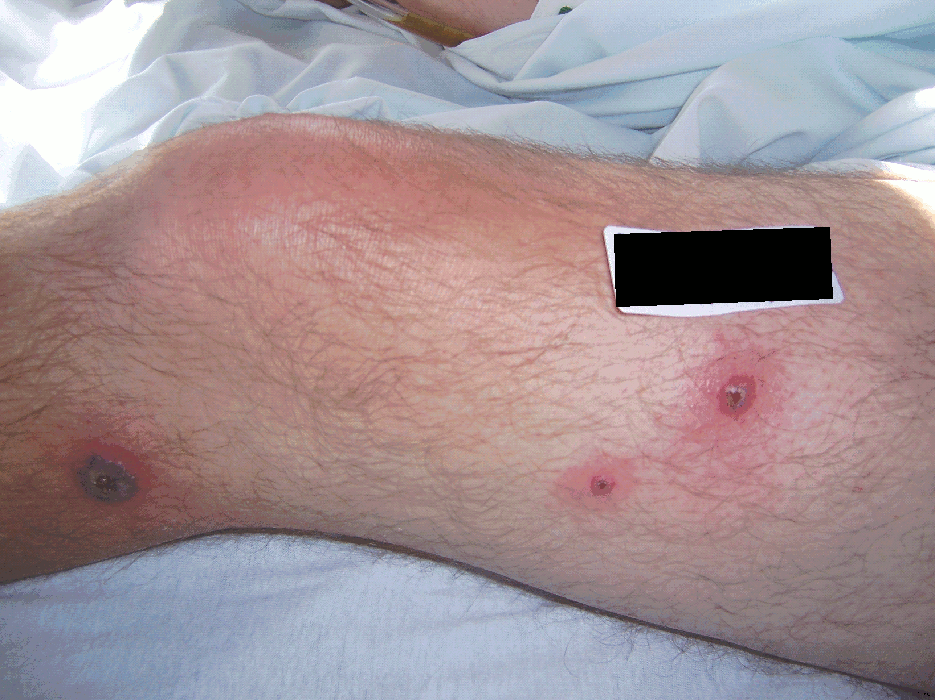
Pustular lesions with central necrosis on the left leg of a patient with Sweet's syndrome associated with Crohn's disease.

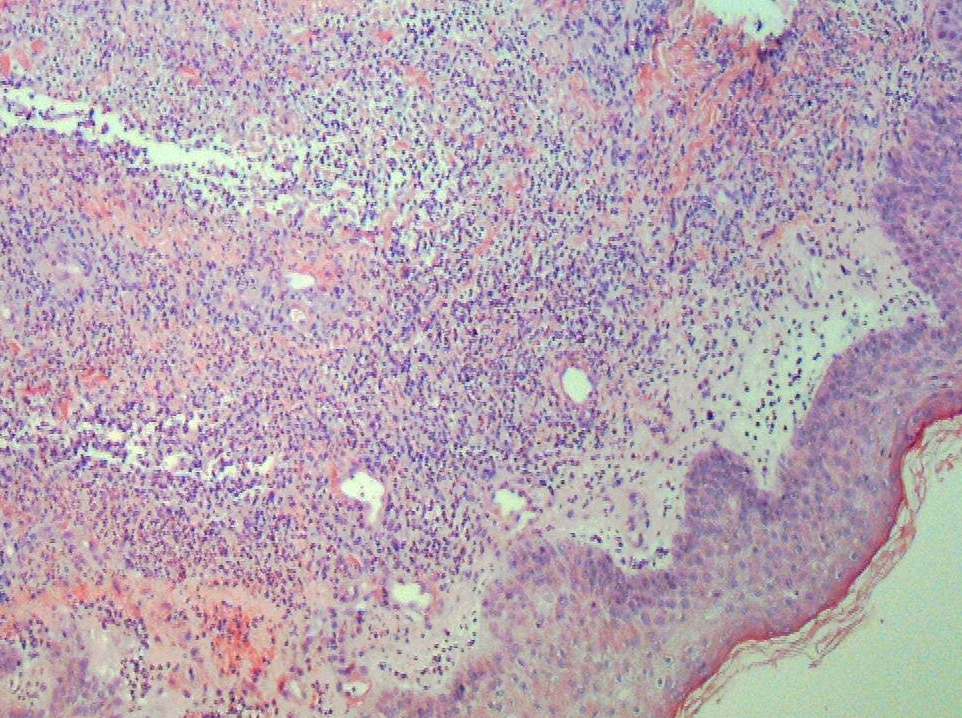
Punch biopsy of a skin lesion showing neutrophilic infiltration in the dermis, with no evidence of vasculitis (same patient with Crohn's disease).

Acute, tender, erythematous plaques, nodes, pseudovesicles and, occasionally, blisters with an annular or arciform pattern occur on the head, neck, legs, and arms, particularly the back of the hands and fingers. The trunk is rarely involved. Common symptoms include fever (50% of cases), joint pain (arthralgia or arthritis) (62%), eye inflammation (most frequently conjunctivitis or iridocyclitis, 38%); and oral aphthae (13%) are associated features.

== Cause ==
SS can be classified based upon the clinical setting in which it occurs: classical or idiopathic SS, malignancy-associated SS, and drug-induced SS.

=== Systemic diseases ===
SS is a reactive phenomenon and should be considered a skin-visible marker of systemic disease. Careful systemic evaluation is indicated, especially when skin lesions are severe or blood tests are abnormal. Approximately 20% of cases are associated with cancers, predominantly of the blood and especially acute myelogenous leukemia (AML). Up to 50% of cases involve an underlying condition, such as streptococcal infection, inflammatory bowel disease, nonlymphocytic leukemia and other hematologic malignancies, solid tumors, or pregnancy. Attacks of SS may precede the hematologic diagnosis by 3 months to 6 years, so that close evaluation of patients in the “idiopathic” group is required.

There is now good evidence that treatment with hematopoietic growth factors—including granulocyte colony-stimulating factor (G-CSF), which is used to treat neutropenia, and granulocyte-macrophage colony-stimulating factor—can cause SS. Lesions typically occur when the patient has leukocytosis and neutrophilia but not when the patient is neutropenic. However, G-CSF may cause SS in neutropenic patients because it causes stem cell proliferation, the differentiation of neutrophils, and the prolongation of neutrophil survival.

=== Associations ===
Although it may occur in the absence of other known disease, SS is often associated with hematologic disease (including leukemia, most commonly acute myelogenous leukemia), solid cancers (especially genitourinary, gastrointestinal and breast cancer) and immunologic diseases including rheumatoid arthritis, and inflammatory bowel disease, Behçet's syndrome.

Pregnancy associated Sweet syndrome typically presents in the first or second trimester. It may recur with subsequent pregnancies, but there seems to be no risk to the fetus.

A genetic association has been suggested, but no specific genetic link has been identified.

In Sweet syndrome, inflammatory lesions are known to occur not only on the skin, but also in various organs. When complications such as encephalitis or meningitis occur, it is referred to as neuro-Sweet disease. It is known that treatment with corticosteroids often leads to favorable outcomes, and the frequencies of human leukocyte antigen (HLA) types B54 and Cw1 are notably high, indicating their association with the condition. However, it is suggested that multiple risk factors, including these, are involved in the onset of the disease. While the more frequent HLA type associated with a related disorder, neuro-Behçet's disease, is different (B51), it is believed to form a spectrum of disorders with other shared predisposing factors.

== Diagnosis ==
The clinical differential diagnosis includes pyoderma gangrenosum, infection, erythema multiforme, adverse drug reactions, and urticaria. Recurrences are common and affect up to one third of patients.

=== Laboratory studies ===
Studies show a moderate neutrophilia (less than 50%), elevated ESR (greater than 30 mm/h) (90%), and a slight increase in alkaline phosphatase (83%). Skin biopsy shows a papillary and mid-dermal mixed infiltrate of polymorphonuclear leukocytes with nuclear fragmentation and histiocytic cells. The infiltrate is predominantly perivascular with endothelial-cell swelling in some vessels, but vasculitic changes (blood clots; deposition of fibrin, complement, or immunoglobulins within the vessel walls; red blood cell extravasation;inflammatory infiltration of vascular walls) are absent in early lesions. Perivasculitis occurs secondarily, because of cytokines released by the lesional neutrophils. True transmural vasculitis is not an expected finding histopathologically in SS.

=== Definition ===
Sweet described a disease with four features: fever; leukocytosis; acute, tender, red plaques; and a papillary dermal infiltrate of neutrophils. This led to the name acute febrile neutrophilic dermatosis. Larger series of patients showed that fever and neutrophilia are not consistently present. The diagnosis is based on the two constant features, a typical eruption and the characteristic histologic features; thus the eponym "Sweet's syndrome" is used.

== Treatment ==
Systemic corticosteroids such as (prednisone) can produce rapid improvement and are the “gold standard” for treatment. The temperature, white blood cell count, and eruption improve within 72 hours. The skin lesions clear within 3 to 9 days. Abnormal laboratory values rapidly return to normal. There are, however, frequent recurrences. Corticosteroids are tapered within 2 to 6 weeks to zero. Resolution of the eruption is occasionally followed by milia and scarring. The disease clears spontaneously in some patients. Topical and/or intralesional corticosteroids may be effective as either monotherapy or adjuvant therapy. Oral potassium iodide or colchicine may induce rapid resolution. Patients who have a potential systemic infection or in whom corticosteroids are contraindicated can use these agents as a first-line therapy. In one study, indomethacin, 150 mg per day, was given for the first week, and 100 mg per day was given for 2 additional weeks. Seventeen of 18 patients had a good initial response; fever and arthralgias were markedly attenuated within 48 hours, and eruptions cleared between 7 and 14 days. Patients whose cutaneous lesions continued to develop were successfully treated with prednisone (1 mg/kg per day). No patient had a relapse after discontinuation of indomethacin. Other alternatives to corticosteroid treatment include dapsone, doxycycline, clofazimine, and cyclosporine. All of these drugs influence migration and other functions of neutrophils.

== See also ==
- Chloroma
- List of cutaneous conditions
- Periodic fever syndrome, also known as autoinflammatory diseases or autoinflammatory syndromes
