= Superficial granulomatous pyoderma =

- Specialty: Dermatology

Superficial granulomatous pyoderma is a cutaneous condition, a variant of pyoderma gangrenosum characterized by a localized superficial vegetative or ulcerative lesion, which usually follows trauma, such as surgery.

== Signs and symptoms ==
In superficial granulomatous pyoderma, ulcers typically have a clean base and vegetating borders, making them more superficial. Unlike pyoderma gangrenosum, superficial granulomatous pyoderma is more frequently associated with truncal involvement and is not always linked to underlying systemic disease.

== See also ==
- PAPA syndrome
- List of cutaneous conditions
