= Benediktos Adamantiades =

Greek ophthalmologist

Benediktos Adamantiades (Greek: Βενέδικτος Αδαμαντιάδης; 1875 in Bursa – 1962 in Athens) was an Ottoman-born, Greek ophthalmologist. To honor his major scientific medical contributions, Behçet's disease is often called Adamantiades–Behçet's disease after him.

== Life and scientific contributions ==
He was born to Fotios Adamantiades a teacher in Bursa in Ottoman Empire. He became orphaned in an early age and raised by his uncle a metropolitan in Thrace and Turkey. He completed his high school studies in the Illustrious School of the Nation, where he graduated with excellent grades in 1892. Then he visited Athens with the intent of becoming an engineer, but the Polytechnic of Athens had stopped its enrollments by the time he got there, so he enrolled in the Medical School instead.

He returned to the Ottoman Empire, where he practiced as a general practitioner from 1896 until 1911, Then he would travel to Paris where he would specialize in ophthalmology in the hospitals of Quinze Vingt and Hôtel Dieu until 1914. Upon his return he was drafted into the Ottoman Army because of the outbreak of the First World War. He served for one year and then was released due to a severe gastrointestinal disease. After the Greco-Turkish War of 1920 he was one of the refugees to come to Greece. There he was appointed head of the Ophthalmology Department of Hippocration Hospital – then known as Athens Refugee Hospital – in Athens, where he developed significant scientific activities.

During the annual meeting of the Medical Society of Athens on November 15, 1930, Adamantiades presented "A case of relapsing iritis with hypopyon" identifying the three major signs of the so-called Adamantiades–Behçet's disease and insisting on a single clinical entity. In the same year, his lecture was published in the Proceedings of the Medical Society of Athens, and in 1931 in the French journal Annales d'oculistique. In the year 1946, Adamantiades defined thrombophlebitis as the 4th major sign of the disease. Later, he presented the first classification of the disease by describing the ocular, mucocutaneous and systemic forms in a review work. He pointed out that the disease can occur for years as a monosymptomatic or oligosymptomatic disorder and that eye involvement and severe prognosis are more common in men than in women. In this work he also proposed the first diagnostic criteria. In addition to Adamantiades–Behçet's disease, Adamantiades described the interstitial keratitis in trachomatic patients to be a bacterial infection and classified the epidemic idiopathic hemeralopia.

Further pioneer works were those on the marginal corneal degeneration, the posterior vitreous detachment, the measurement of the optic fundi and of the ocular pressure as well as investigations on trachoma, uveitis and the pathogenesis of glaucoma. Adamantiades compiled over 200 scientific papers (mostly in Greek and in French) many of which marked a new stage in his field. He also had a small contribution in the Center of Asia Minor Studies in Athens. He got married in an advanced age and his adopted daughter Ourania Ragkavi became the first female ophthalmologist in Greece. He died in 1962 in Athens.
