= PTPN18 =

Protein-coding gene in the species Homo sapiens

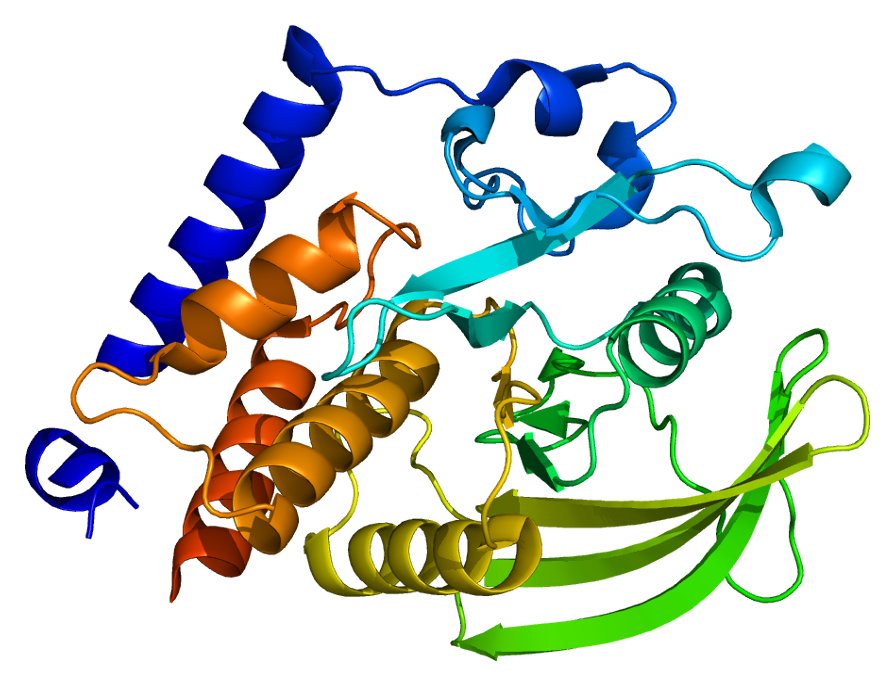

Identifiers
- Aliases: PTPN18, BDP1, PTP-HSCF, protein tyrosine phosphatase, non-receptor type 18, protein tyrosine phosphatase non-receptor type 18
- External IDs: OMIM: 606587; MGI: 108410; GeneCards: PTPN18
Available structures
| PDB | Ortholog search: PDBe RCSB |
| PDB | List of PDB id codes 2OC3, 4GFU, 4GFV, 4NND |
Enzyme activity
| EC # | BRENDA | ExPASy | KEGG | MetaCyc |
|---|---|---|---|---|
| 3.1.3.48 | ↗ | ↗ | ↗ | ↗ |

Gene location (Human)
| Chr. | Chromosome 2 (human) |
| Band | 2q21.1 | Start | 130,356,045 bp |
| Band | 2q21.1 | End | 130,375,405 bp |

Gene location (Mouse)
| Chr. | Chromosome 1 (mouse) |
| Band | 1 B|1 13.25 cM | Start | 34,498,843 bp |
| Band | 1 B|1 13.25 cM | End | 34,514,814 bp |
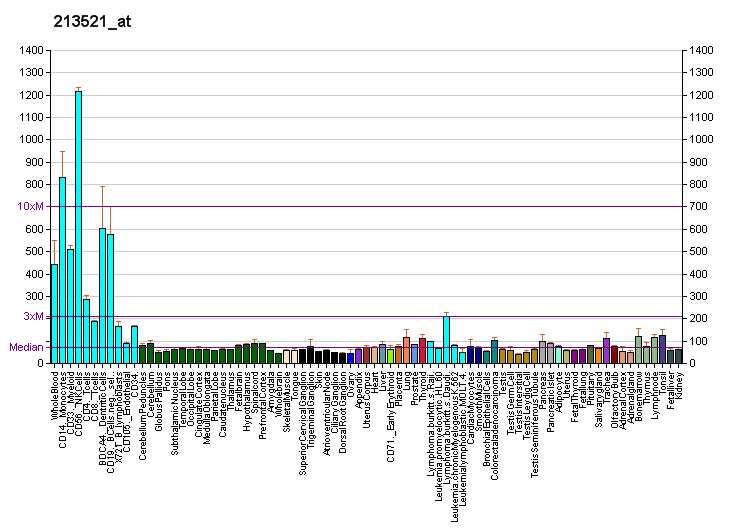

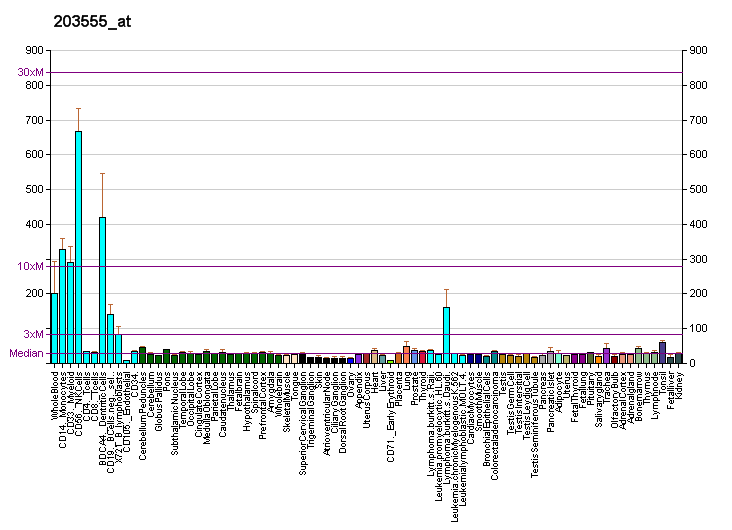
RNA expression pattern
| Bgee | Human / Mouse (ortholog); Top expressed in: granulocyte; monocyte; right uterine tube; mucosa of transverse colon; rectum; cerebellar hemisphere; right hemisphere of cerebellum; spleen; tendon of biceps brachii; body of pancreas / Top expressed in: granulocyte; thymus; blood; spleen; mesenteric lymph nodes; submandibular gland; tibiofemoral joint; duodenum; lacrimal gland; primary oocyte; More reference expression data |
| BioGPS | More reference expression data |
Gene ontology
| Molecular function | protein binding; non-membrane spanning protein tyrosine phosphatase activity; phosphatase activity; phosphoprotein phosphatase activity; hydrolase activity; protein tyrosine phosphatase activity |
| Cellular component | nucleus; cytoplasm; cytosol; nucleoplasm |
| Biological process | protein dephosphorylation; peptidyl-tyrosine dephosphorylation; dephosphorylation; ERBB2 signaling pathway; negative regulation of ERBB signaling pathway; cellular response to cytokine stimulus; blastocyst formation |
Sources:Amigo / QuickGO
Orthologs
| Databases | NCBI: entry; OMA: entry |
| Species | Human | Mouse |
| Entrez | 26469 | 19253 |
| Ensembl | ENSG00000072135 | ENSMUSG00000026126 |
| UniProt | Q99952 | Q61152 |
| RefSeq (mRNA) | NM_001142370; NM_014369 | NM_011206 |
| RefSeq (protein) | NP_001135842; NP_055184 | NP_035336 |
| Location (UCSC) | Chr 2: 130.36 – 130.38 Mb | Chr 1: 34.5 – 34.51 Mb |
| PubMed search |
- Wikidata
| View/Edit Human | View/Edit Mouse |

Tyrosine-protein phosphatase non-receptor type 18 is an enzyme that in humans is encoded by the PTPN18 gene.

The protein encoded by this gene is a member of the protein tyrosine phosphatase (PTP) family. PTPs are known to be signaling molecules that regulate a variety of cellular processes including cell growth, differentiation, mitotic cycle, and oncogenic transformation. This PTP contains a PEST motif, which often serves as a protein-protein interaction domain, and may be related to protein intracellular half-life. This gene was found to be expressed in brain, colon tissues, and several different tumor-derived cell lines. It has been shown that nuclear import of PTPN18 can suppress the formation of tumors during breast cancer. The biological function of this PTP has not yet been determined.

== Interactions ==
PTPN18 has been shown to interact with PSTPIP1.
