= Hulusi Behçet =

Turkish dermatologist (1889–1948)

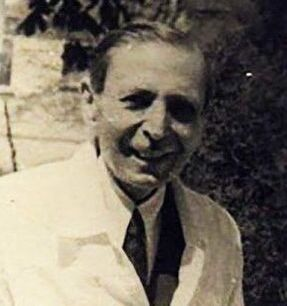
- Born: 20 February 1889; Konstantiniyye, Ottoman Empire
- Died: 8 March 1948 (aged 59); Istanbul, Turkey
- Occupations: Physician, scientist
- Known for: Behçet's disease
- Website: www.hulusibehcet.net

Hulusi Behçet (Ottoman Turkish: خلوصی بهجت; Turkish: [behˈtʃet]; 20 February 1889 – 8 March 1948) was a Turkish dermatologist and scientist. He described a disease of inflamed blood vessels in 1937, which is named after him as Behçet's disease. His portrait was depicted on a former Turkish postcard stamp.

== Early life ==
Born to Turkish parents, as his father was an official in the Ottoman Empire, they emigrated to Damascus where he spent his early childhood after he lost his mother to an illness.

== Professional works ==
During World War I (1914–1918), he served at the military hospital in Edirne as a specialist in dermatology and venereal diseases and was assigned to the head of the hospital as an assistant. After the war, between 1918 and 1919, he first went to Budapest, Hungary and then to Berlin, Germany to improve his medical knowledge. He had the opportunity to meet some well-known colleagues there. After his return to Turkey, he went into private practice. In 1923, Behçet was appointed as the head physician at the Hasköy Venereal Diseases Hospital at Golden Horn in Istanbul. Shortly after, he moved to Guraba Hospital, which is now part of the School of Medicine Bezmialem University. While he lectured at the university, he continued his private practice as well.

== Scientific works ==
In 1933, Istanbul University was re-established out of the old-fashioned Dar-ul Fünun. During this period of reform, Behçet founded the department of dermatology and venereal diseases. His curiosity for research, writing, and discussion were his intellectual characteristics. Starting from the early years in his profession, his participation in national and international congresses with original articles was very apparent, publishing many articles at home and abroad. The famous German pathologist Philipp Schwartz once called him "a scientist who was well known everywhere, but in his country", adding that "you could never find him in Turkey because he was always abroad presenting his findings". He translated many articles into Turkish to help educate new generations and published original case reports in international reviews in order to make contact with such far countries as Korea.

He was interested in syphilis since 1922 and had published many international articles on its diagnosis, treatment, hereditary properties, serology, and social aspects. Leishmaniasis (Oriental sore) was another disease, which Behçet worked on, beginning in 1923. He wrote about it in many articles and succeeded in its treatment with diathermic. He first described "the nail sign" appearing by the removal of the crust of an oriental sore. A part of his published work was concerned with parasitosis. In 1923, he described the etiologic agents of "gale cereal" in Turkey. Behçet dealt with superficial and deep mycosis and their treatments. Due to his observations, he described the dermatitis of fig in 1933. In 1935, at the Dermatology Congress in Budapest, he was honored for his studies on mycosis. He was also in the publishing vanguard to improve Turkish medicine and he was responsible for the first dermato-venerology journal of Turkey called ’’Turkish Archives of Dermatology and Syphilology’’ in 1924. In 1939, he was elected as a correspondent member to the German scientific journals ’’Dermatologische Wochenschrift’’ and ’’Medizinische Wochenschrift’’. The same year, he was promoted to ordinary professor. The most important work that Behçet brought to Turkish medicine was the monograph published in 1940 called ’’Clinical and Practical Syphilis, Diagnosis and Related Dermatoses’’. Every page of this book contains an aspect of syphilis and the footnotes provide a wealth of detailed information about the differential diagnosis of other skin diseases. As a result, scientists had the chance to learn about syphilis and dermatology at the same time. This book, despite its outdated style, still retains its value and spirit in medicine as being the only example in its field. Behçet continued as the Head of the Department of Dermatology and Venereal Diseases until 1947.

== Behçet's disease ==
His first observations on Behçet's disease began with a patient he met between 1924 and 1925. This man had been consulted for 40 years in Istanbul and Vienna, Austria several times. According to his symptoms, the illness had been diagnosed. From the aetiology, syphilis and tuberculosis were suspected. Austrian doctors had called it an unknown protozoal disease. Ophthalmologists had described the ocular symptoms as iritis, which might be the result of syphilis, tuberculosis or streptococcal or staphylococcal infections. After several iridectomies, the patient had completely lost his vision. Behçet continued to follow up the patient for many years.

In 1930, a woman suffering from irritation in her eye and with lesions in her mouth and genital regions was referred to Behçet's clinic and told him that these symptoms had been recurring for several years. He consulted the patient until 1932 and tried to diagnose the aetiological agent for tuberculosis, syphilis or mycosis etc. by biopsy and other laboratory analysis, but he could not find anything. The prominent ophthalmologists Murat Rahmi and Iggescheimer had been also consulted.

Following those two patients, in 1936 a male patient from a dental clinic with oral wounds, acneiform signs on the back, scrotal ulcer, eye irritation, evening fever, and abdominal pain was sent to his clinic. After the consultation, nothing except a dental cyst was found. Behçet thought the recurrent symptoms might be due to a virus. He referred the patient to Braun, who did a viral investigation and found some corpuscular structures.

Behçet, with the symptoms of these three patients whom he had followed for years, then decided that they were the symptoms of a new disease and in 1936, he described the situation in a meeting and this was published in the Archives of Dermatology and Venereal Disease. He wrote in 1937 his ideas in the "Dermatologische Wochenschrift" and the same year he presented it at the meeting of the Dermatology Association of Paris. At this meeting, he declared that a dental infection might cause the etiology of the disease. In 1938, he published his ideas about the subject in the "Dermatologische Wochenschrift" in a more detailed form. In the same year, Niyazi Gözcü and Frank reported two new cases with the same symptoms. The Belgian scientists Weekers and Reginster, and the Italian Frachescetti reported some patients with similar symptoms. Therefore, European doctors had accepted the appearance of a new disease.

Ophthalmologists had begun to accept "Behçet's Disease", but dermatologists kept denying the new disease, insisting they could be symptoms of known diseases. While that debate was taking place, some new cases were reported from Belgium, Austria, the U.S., Japan, Denmark and Switzerland. When they had been published, the whole world finally came to accept that they were confronted with a new disease. In 1947, at the suggestion of Mischner of the Zurich Medical Faculty during the International Medical Congress of Geneva, the finding of Behçet was named "Morbus Behçet". Though it was evaluated in the early days as "Behçet's Syndrome", "Trisymptom Behçet", and "Morbus Behçet", today the disease is universally called ‘’’Behçet's Disease’’’ in medical literature. Behçet published 126 national and international articles between 1921 and 1940. 53 of those appeared in prestigious European scientific journals.

== Personal life ==
Behçet was deeply interested in the arts, particularly literature. Generally, he was a nervous man and suffered from insomnia, colitis and angina pectoris, but sometimes he was joyful and good-humored among friends. He divorced from his wife in 1941. He died of a heart attack on 8 March 1948. He also liked to travel. This, together with his passion for dermatology and education, led him to many national and international medical congresses. He also published 137 scientific papers, 2 books, 12 monographs and 17 medical translations.

== Commemoration ==
In 1975, 27 years after his death, he was honored with the TÜBİTAK Scientific Award. Several classes, laboratories, and libraries had been named in his honor. In national and international congresses, events like "Korean-Turkish Behçet Days" take place. In 1980, on the initiative of one of his students, a postal stamp was issued in his commemoration, about which an article was published in the Journal of the American Dental Association. His biography was published in the Journal of Philatelic Society and in the Medical Bulletin of the United States Army, Europe’’ and ’’Seventh Army's Medical Bulletin.

In 1982, he was awarded the Medical Award of the Turkish Republic by the Eczacıbaşı Foundation of Scientific Research. In 1996, the Turkish mint released a silver commemorative coin for Behçet during the National Dermatology Congress.
