= Pathergy =

Skin condition causing skin lesions

Pathergy is a skin condition in which a minor trauma such as a bump or bruise leads to the development of skin lesions or ulcers that may be resistant to healing. Pathergy can also lead to ulcerations at the site of surgical incisions. Pathergy is seen with both Behçet's disease and pyoderma gangrenosum. A highly similar phenomenon known as the Koebner phenomenon occurs in autoimmune diseases such as psoriasis and systemic lupus erythematosus, among others.

Doctors looking toward a diagnosis of Behçet's disease may attempt to induce a pathergy reaction with a test known as a "skin prick test". The inflammation and ulceration that occurs as a result of pathergy in pyoderma gangrenosum often responds to systemic steroid therapy.

The pathergy reaction is a unique feature of Behçet's disease and, according to the International Study Group for Behcet's Disease, is among the major criteria required for the diagnosis. Different positive pathergy reaction rates in BD have been reported worldwide. When BD-positive groups are studied for pathergy reaction, the pathergy-positive and pathergy-negative BD groups showed a similar male: female ratio, age at disease onset, and mean disease duration. They also exhibited similar HLA-B51 levels and a similar frequency of oral ulcerations in close family members. The mucocutaneous manifestations, systemic disease expression, and severity score were similar in patients with and without the pathergy reaction. The presence of a positive pathergy reaction is not associated with an increased risk for specific mucocutaneous or systemic manifestations of the disease, and probably does not predict a more severe disease course.

While a positive pathergy reaction helps to confirm a specific Behçet's disease diagnosis, a negative reaction does not invalidate a BD diagnosis, because the disease process has to be active at the time of the skin prick test to produce a pathergy reaction. Differences in positive/negative pathergy and severity of the reaction depend on disease activity, ethnicity, type of needle used for the prick test, among other factors.

Pathergy test is done both orally and cutaneous.

Orally, the lower lip is the site of testing. Appearance of any ulcer or papule indicates a positive pathergy reaction.

Cutaneous sites are the flexor forearm.

== See also ==
- Skin condition
- List of skin conditions
