= GIMAP4 =

Type of enzyme

Identifiers
- Aliases: GIMAP4, IAN-1, IAN1, IMAP4, MSTP062, GTPase, IMAP family member 4
- External IDs: OMIM: 608087; MGI: 1349656; GeneCards: GIMAP4
Available structures
PDB	Ortholog search: PDBe RCSB
PDB	List of PDB id codes 3LXX

Gene location (Mouse)
Chr.	Chromosome 6 (mouse)
Band	6|6 B2.3	Start	48,661,483 bp
Band	6|6 B2.3	End	48,668,994 bp
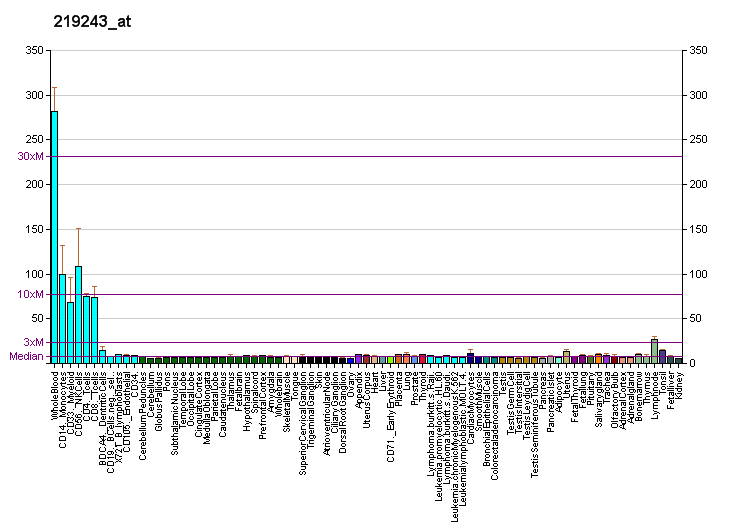
RNA expression pattern
Bgee	Human / Mouse (ortholog); Top expressed in: monocyte; blood; right lung; lymph node; spleen; appendix; superficial temporal artery; pericardium; Achilles tendon; lower lobe of lung / Top expressed in: mesenteric lymph nodes; spleen; right lung lobe; left lung; left lung lobe; renal corpuscle; blood; thymus; carotid body; subcutaneous adipose tissue; More reference expression data
BioGPS	More reference expression data
Orthologs
Databases	NCBI: entry
Species	Human	Mouse
Entrez	55303	107526
Ensembl	n/a	ENSMUSG00000054435
UniProt	Q9NUV9	Q99JY3
RefSeq (mRNA)	NM_018326; NM_001363532	NM_001243199; NM_001243200; NM_001243201; NM_174990; NM_175048
RefSeq (protein)	NP_060796; NP_001350461	NP_001230128; NP_001230129; NP_001230130; NP_778155; NP_778213
Location (UCSC)	n/a	Chr 6: 48.66 – 48.67 Mb
PubMed search
- Wikidata
View/Edit Human	View/Edit Mouse

GTPase IMAP family member 4 is an enzyme that in humans is encoded by the GIMAP4 gene.

This gene encodes a protein belonging to the GTP-binding superfamily and to the immuno-associated nucleotide (IAN) subfamily of nucleotide-binding proteins. The encoded protein of this gene may be negatively regulated by T-cell acute lymphocytic leukemia 1 (TAL1). In humans, the IAN subfamily genes are located in a cluster at 7q36.1.
