= Infliximab =

Biopharmaceutical drug for autoimmune disorders

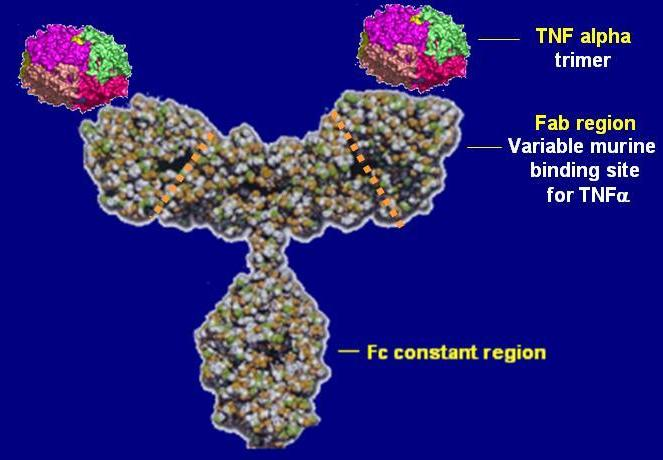

Monoclonal antibody
- Type: Whole antibody
- Source: Chimeric (mouse/human)
- Target: Tumor necrosis factors (TNF)

Clinical data
- Trade names: Remicade, others
- Biosimilars: infliximab-abda, infliximab-axxq, infliximab-dyyb, infliximab-qbtx, Avsola, Flixabi, Inflectra, Ixifi, Remsima, Renflexis, Zessly, Zymfentra
- AHFS/Drugs.com: Monograph
- MedlinePlus: a604023
- License data: US DailyMed: Infliximab
- Pregnancy category: AU: C
- Routes of administration: Intravenous, subcutaneous
- ATC code: L04AB02 (WHO)

Legal status
- Legal status: AU: S4 (Prescription only); CA: ℞-only / Schedule D; UK: POM (Prescription only); US: ℞-only; EU: Rx-only

Pharmacokinetic data
- Bioavailability: 92% (IV, if 8% left in the syringe)
- Metabolism: reticuloendothelial system
- Elimination half-life: 9.5 days

Identifiers
- CAS Number: 170277-31-3
- DrugBank: DB00065
- ChemSpider: none
- UNII: B72HH48FLU
- KEGG: D02598
- ChEMBL: ChEMBL1201581
- CompTox Dashboard (EPA): DTXSID9040504

Chemical and physical data
- Formula: C_{6428}H_{9912}N_{1694}O_{1987}S_{46}
- Molar mass: 144190.64 g·mol^{−1}

Infliximab, a chimeric monoclonal antibody, sold under the brand name Remicade among others, is a medication used to treat a number of autoimmune diseases. This includes Crohn's disease, ulcerative colitis, rheumatoid arthritis, ankylosing spondylitis, psoriasis, psoriatic arthritis, and Behçet's disease. It is given by slow injection into a vein, typically at six- to eight-week intervals.

Common side effects include infections, acute infusion reactions, and abdominal pain. Infliximab is a chimeric monoclonal antibody biologic. It seems to work by binding to and neutralizing TNF, preventing it from interacting with its receptors on the cell. TNF is a chemical messenger (cytokine) and a key part of the autoimmune reaction.

Infliximab was originally developed in mice as a mouse antibody. Because humans have immune reactions to mouse proteins, the mouse common domains were replaced with similar human antibody domains. They are monoclonal antibodies and have identical structures and affinities to the target. Because they are a combination of mouse and human antibody amino acid sequences, they are called a "chimeric monoclonal antibody".

Infliximab was approved for medical use in the United States in 1998, and in the European Union in August 1999. Infliximab biosimilars have been approved in the EU (2013), in Japan (2014), and in the United States (2016, 2017, 2019). Infliximab is a therapeutic alternative on the World Health Organization's List of Essential Medicines.

== Medical uses ==
=== Crohn's disease ===
Three phenotypes, or categories of disease, are present in Crohn's disease: stricturing disease (which causes narrowing of the bowel), penetrating disease (which causes fistulae or abnormal connections of the bowel), and inflammatory disease (which primarily causes inflammation).

==== Fistulizing disease ====
Infliximab was first used for closure of fistulae in Crohn's disease in 1999. In a 94-patient, phase II clinical trial, the researchers showed infliximab was effective in closing fistulae between the skin and bowel in 56–68% of patients. A large, 296-patient Phase III clinical trial called the ACCENT 2 trial showed infliximab was additionally beneficial in maintaining closure of fistulae, with almost two-thirds of all patients treated with the three initial doses of infliximab having a fistula response after 14 weeks, and 36% of patients maintaining closure of fistulae after a year, compared with 19% who received placebo therapy. This final trial resulted in the FDA approval of the drug to treat fistulizing disease.

==== Inflammatory disease ====
Infliximab has been used to induce and maintain remission in inflammatory Crohn's disease. The ACCENT 1 trial, a large, multicentre trial, found 39–45% of patients treated with infliximab, who had an initial response to it, maintained remission after 30 weeks, compared with 21% who received placebo treatment. It also showed a mean maintenance of remission from 38 to 54 weeks compared with 21 weeks for patients who received placebo treatment.

Crohn's patients have flares of their disease between periods of disease quiescence. Severe flares are usually treated with steroid medications to obtain remission, but steroids have many undesirable side effects, so some gastroenterologists are now advocating the use of infliximab as the first drug to try to get patients into remission. This has been called the top-down approach to treatment.

=== Ulcerative colitis ===
Infliximab targets TNF, thought to be more related to Th1 cytokines. Ulcerative colitis was thought to be a Th2 disease, and infliximab would be of limited use. However, patients with ulcerative colitis have begun to be treated with infliximab on the basis of two large clinical trials conducted in 2005 by Paul Rutgeerts and William Sandborn. The Acute ulcerative Colitis Treatment trials (ACT1 and ACT2) to evaluate the utility of infliximab in ulcerative colitis showed 44–45% of patients treated with infliximab for a year maintained a response to the medication, compared with 21% of patients who were treated with placebo medication. At two months, the response was 61–69% for patients treated with infliximab, and 31% for those treated with placebo.

=== Psoriatic arthritis ===
In psoriatic arthritis (PsA), inhibitors of TNF, such as infliximab, improve the signs and symptoms. Several therapies with modest efficacy have been studied in nail psoriasis. Among available agents, higher quality data are available to support the efficacy of cyclosporine and infliximab. Based on studies in AS, the results suggest infliximab, etanercept, and adalimumab have the potential to reduce the signs and symptoms of moderate to severely active axial involvement in PsA in patients who have had an inadequate response to NSAID (level 1a, grade A). The anti-TNF agents (infliximab and etanercept; level 1b, grade A) are more effective for the treatment of enthesitis than traditional agents. Results suggest infliximab is effective for the treatment of dactylitis in PsA.

=== Other ===
It was approved for treating ankylosing spondylitis, psoriatic arthritis, psoriasis, rheumatoid arthritis.

Infliximab is also prescribed (out of indication) for the treatment of Behçet's disease.

Infliximab is the most frequently used biological agent in treating relapsing polychondritis. Half of the patients saw benefit from this treatment, and a few other patients experienced infections that in some cases lead to death.

There have been numerous case reports of the efficacy of infliximab in various inflammatory skin conditions diseases; the FDA approved infliximab for chronic severe plaque psoriasis in adults in September 2006.

Infliximab has been used off-label in treating refractory sarcoidosis, where other treatments have not been effective.

Infliximab has been tested in chronic obstructive pulmonary disease (COPD) but there was no evidence of benefit with the possibility of harm.

Infliximab is indicated for steroid refractory checkpoint inhibitor induced colitis, at a dose of 5 to 10 mg/kg.

Infliximab has been found to be a safe alternative treatment to a second dose of IVIG for Kawasaki disease resistant to initial IVIG therapy, showing better outcomes in fever resolution and fewer severe adverse effects such as hemolytic anemia.

== Adverse effects ==
Infliximab has adverse effects, some life-threatening, common to drugs in the class of TNF-inhibiting immunosuppressants (which also includes etanercept (Enbrel) and adalimumab (Humira)). Some of the most severe are:

- serious infections
- reactivation of hepatitis B
- reactivation of tuberculosis
- lethal hepatosplenic T-cell lymphoma (generally only when combined with 6-mercaptopurine)
- drug-induced lupus
- demyelinating central nervous system disorders
- psoriasis and psoriasiform skin lesions
- new-onset vitiligo

Cases of leukopenia, neutropenia, thrombocytopenia, and pancytopenia (some fatal) have been reported with infliximab. The FDA issued a warning to doctors appearing in the respective product labeling of infliximab instructing them to screen and monitor potential patients more carefully. The FDA issued a warning to doctors that there is an increased risk of lymphoma and other cancers associated with the use of infliximab and other tumor necrosis factor blockers in children and adolescents.

Maintenance therapy with the drug (versus intermittent or sporadic therapy) lessens the likelihood of developing antibodies to infliximab which are known to reduce the efficacy of the drug. Combination treatment with methotrexate (an antifolate drug which suppresses the immune system) has been shown to reduce the formation of these antibodies in patients with rheumatoid arthritis and combination therapy with other immunosuppressants has been shown to reduce the likelihood of these antibodies being formed in Crohn's disease. The use of immunosuppressants may not be necessary in all diseases for which infliximab is indicated, and indiscriminant uses of these other immunosuppressants carry their own risks. Infliximab was studied in monotherapy (without concomitant immunosuppressants such as methotrexate or azathioprine) in psoriasis, psoriatic arthritis, and ankylosing spondylitis.

== Pharmacology ==
Infliximab is a purified, recombinant DNA-derived chimeric human-mouse IgG monoclonal antibody that consists of mouse heavy and light chain variable regions combined with human heavy and light chain constant regions. It has a serum half-life of 9.5 days and can be detected in serum 8 weeks after infusion treatment.

Infliximab neutralizes the biological activity of TNF by binding with high affinity to the soluble (free floating in the blood) and transmembrane (located on the outer membranes of T cells and similar immune cells) forms of TNF, and inhibits or prevents the effective binding of TNF with its receptors. Infliximab and adalimumab (another TNF antagonist) are in the subclass of "anti-TNF antibodies" (they are in the form of naturally occurring antibodies), and are capable of neutralizing all forms (extracellular-, transmembrane-, and receptor-bound) of TNF. Etanercept, a third TNF antagonist, is in a different subclass (receptor-construct fusion protein), and, because of its modified form, cannot neutralize receptor-bound TNF. Additionally, the anti-TNF antibodies adalimumab and infliximab have the capability of lysing cells involved in the inflammatory process, whereas the receptor fusion protein apparently lacks this capability.

Other monoclonal antibodies targeting TNF are golimumab, adalimumab, and certolizumab pegol. Etanercept also binds and inhibits the action of TNF, but is not a monoclonal antibody (it is instead a fusion of TNF-receptor and an antibody constant region).

== History ==
The importance of TNF in the development of rheumatoid arthritis was originally demonstrated by George Kollias and colleagues in proof of principle studies in transgenic animal models.

Infliximab was developed by Junming Le (b. 1940) and Jan Vilček (b. 1933) at New York University School of Medicine and in collaboration with Centocor (now Janssen Biotech, Inc.).

== Society and culture ==
=== Marketing ===
Remicade is marketed by Janssen Biotech, Inc. (formerly Centocor Biotech, Inc.) in the United States, Mitsubishi Tanabe Pharma in Japan, Xian Janssen in China, and Schering-Plough (now part of Merck & Co) elsewhere.

=== Biosimilars ===
In June 2013, two biosimilar versions (Inflectra and Remsima) were submitted for approval in the European Union, by Hospira and Celltrion Healthcare respectively. Both had a positive opinion from European Medicines Agency's (EMA) Committee for Medicinal Products for Human Use (CHMP) for sale in the European Union (EU). Celltrion obtained marketing authorization approval (MAA) from 27 EU countries and 3 EEA (European Economic Area) countries by September 2013. Inflectra was approved for use in the European Union in September 2013, and Remsima was approved for use in the European Union in October 2013.

In Japan, Celltrion received marketing authorization for Remsima from Japan's Ministry of Health, Labour and Welfare (MHLW) in July 2014.

In India, Epirus Biopharmaceuticals obtained approval to produce biosimilar infliximab under the brand name "Infimab" (trail name BOW015).

The US Food and Drug Administration (FDA) approved Celltrion/Hospira/Pfizer's Inflectra (infliximab-dyyb) in April 2016.

The FDA approved Samsung Bioepis Co., Ltd.'s Renflexis (infliximab-abda) in April 2017.

Biogen released another biosimilar, Flixabi, which was approved in Germany, the UK, and the Netherlands. Flixabi was approved for use in the European Union in May 2016.

In December 2017, Ixifi (infliximab-qbtx) was approved in the United States.

Zessly was approved for use in the European Union in May 2018.

In December 2019, Avsola (infliximab-axxq) was approved in the United States.

Avsola was approved for medical use in Canada in March 2020.

In December 2021, Ixifi was approved for medical use in Canada.

=== Availability/affordability ===
Infliximab is supplied as a sterile, white, lyophilized (freeze-dried) powder, so must be reconstituted and administered by a health care professional, usually in a hospital or office setting. For this reason, it is usually covered under major medical insurance rather than prescription drug coverage. The loading regimen for all approved indications occurs at weeks 0, 2, and 6 at the above dosages.

In the UK, infliximab is available from the NHS for Crohn's disease treatment provided three criteria are met. Patients should have severe active Crohn's disease with a CDAI score of 300 or more, have not responded to immunomodulating drugs and corticosteroids, and for whom surgery is inappropriate. Since February 2015, it is also approved for the treatment of ulcerative colitis where other treatments have not worked.

In Australia, infliximab is available through the PBS for Crohn's disease treatment provided the patient has not responded to conventional treatment and has a severe case of the condition.

Johnson & Johnson reported in its 2013 annual report, "Remicade (infliximab), accounted for approximately 9.4% of the Company's total revenues for fiscal 2013."

A self-injectable, subcutaneous version of infliximab, Zymfentra, was approved for medical use in the United States in October 2023.
