= PSTPIP1 =

Enzyme found in humans

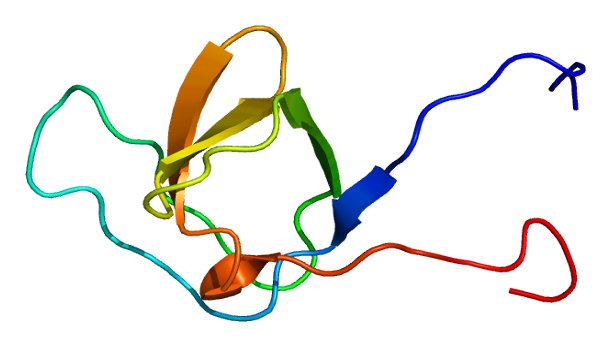

Identifiers
- Aliases: PSTPIP1, CD2BP1, CD2BP1L, CD2BP1S, H-PIP, PAPAS, PSTPIP, proline-serine-threonine phosphatase interacting protein 1
- External IDs: OMIM: 606347; MGI: 1321396; GeneCards: PSTPIP1
Available structures
PDB	Ortholog search: PDBe RCSB
PDB	List of PDB id codes 2DIL

Gene location (Human)
Chr.	Chromosome 15 (human)
Band	15q24.3	Start	76,993,359 bp
Band	15q24.3	End	77,037,475 bp

Gene location (Mouse)
Chr.	Chromosome 9 (mouse)
Band	9|9 B	Start	55,997,246 bp
Band	9|9 B	End	56,036,172 bp
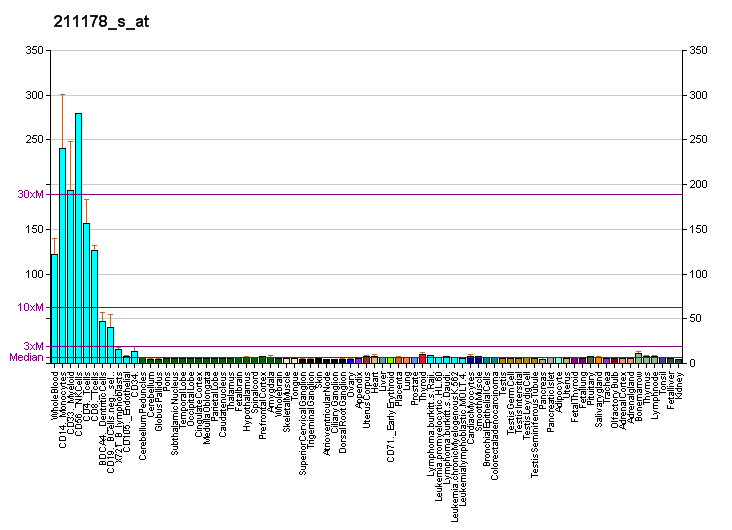
RNA expression pattern
Bgee	Human / Mouse (ortholog); Top expressed in: granulocyte; monocyte; blood; spleen; bone marrow cell; lymph node; appendix; tendon of biceps brachii; Achilles tendon; upper lobe of left lung / Top expressed in: granulocyte; thymus; blood; stroma of bone marrow; mesenteric lymph nodes; molar; tibiofemoral joint; primary oocyte; gastric mucosa; mucous cell of stomach; More reference expression data
BioGPS	More reference expression data
Gene ontology
Molecular function	protein binding; identical protein binding; cytoskeletal protein binding; actin filament binding
Cellular component	cytoplasm; perinuclear region of cytoplasm; cytosol; plasma membrane; uropod; cleavage furrow; cell projection; cytoskeleton; membrane; lamellipodium; actin filament
Biological process	cell adhesion; inflammatory response; endocytosis; signal transduction; immune system process; innate immune response; actin filament polymerization; cell migration
Sources:Amigo / QuickGO
Orthologs
Databases	NCBI: entry; OMA: entry
Species	Human	Mouse
Entrez	9051	19200
Ensembl	ENSG00000140368	ENSMUSG00000032322
UniProt	O43586	P97814
RefSeq (mRNA)	NM_003978; NM_001321135; NM_001321136; NM_001321137	NM_011193
RefSeq (protein)	NP_001308064; NP_001308065; NP_001308066; NP_003969	NP_035323
Location (UCSC)	Chr 15: 76.99 – 77.04 Mb	Chr 9: 56 – 56.04 Mb
PubMed search
- Wikidata
View/Edit Human	View/Edit Mouse

Proline-serine-threonine phosphatase-interacting protein 1 is an enzyme that in humans is encoded by the PSTPIP1 gene.

== Interactions ==
PSTPIP1 has been shown to interact with:

- Abl gene
- BZW1
- CD2
- PTPN12
- PTPN18
- Wiskott–Aldrich syndrome protein

== See also ==
- PAPA syndrome
