= EIF5 =

Protein-coding gene in the species Homo sapiens

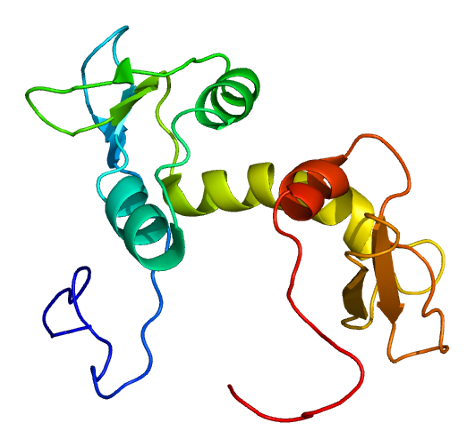
Available structures
PDB	Ortholog search: PDBe RCSB
PDB	List of PDB id codes 2E9H, 2G2K, 2IU1

Identifiers
- Aliases: EIF5, EIF-5, EIF-5A, eukaryotic translation initiation factor 5, Eukaryotic initiation factor 5
- External IDs: OMIM: 601710; MGI: 95309; HomoloGene: 49610; GeneCards: EIF5; OMA:EIF5 - orthologs

Gene location (Human)
Chr.	Chromosome 14 (human)
Band	14q32.32	Start	103,333,544 bp
Band	14q32.32	End	103,345,025 bp

Gene location (Mouse)
Chr.	Chromosome 12 (mouse)
Band	12 F1|12 61.03 cM	Start	111,504,450 bp
Band	12 F1|12 61.03 cM	End	111,513,186 bp
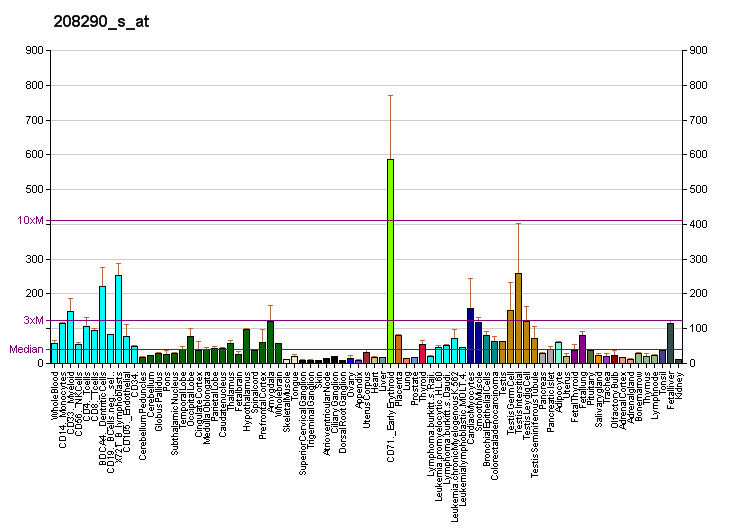

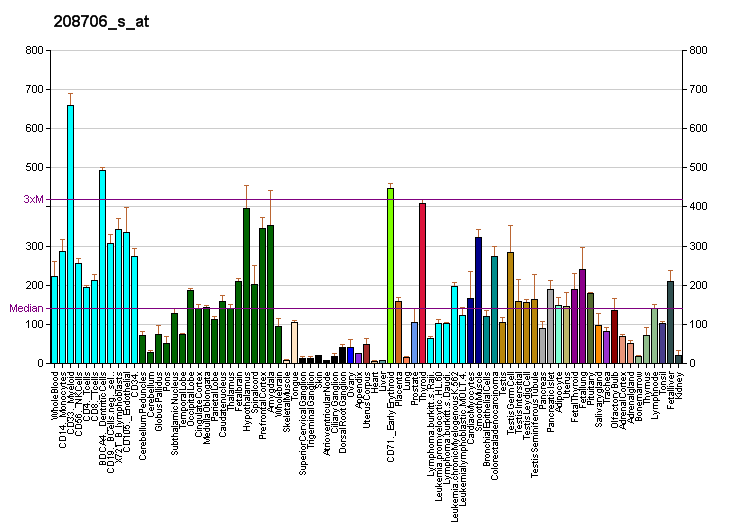

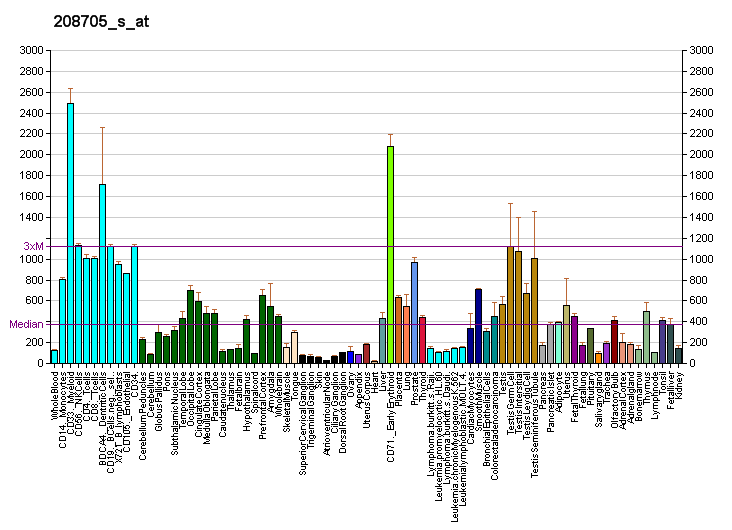
RNA expression pattern
Bgee	Human / Mouse (ortholog); Top expressed in: postcentral gyrus; pons; sperm; external globus pallidus; lateral nuclear group of thalamus; superior frontal gyrus; pars compacta; inferior olivary nucleus; superior vestibular nucleus; oocyte / Top expressed in: otic placode; medullary collecting duct; renal corpuscle; saccule; otic vesicle; blood; human fetus; lacrimal gland; tail of embryo; spermatocyte; More reference expression data
BioGPS	More reference expression data
Gene ontology
Molecular function	translation initiation factor activity; nucleotide binding; translation factor activity, RNA binding; GTP binding; GTPase activity; protein binding; eukaryotic initiation factor eIF2 binding; RNA binding; cadherin binding; GDP-dissociation inhibitor activity
Cellular component	nucleus; plasma membrane; cytoplasm; cytosol
Biological process	regulation of translational initiation; protein biosynthesis; activation of GTPase activity; formation of translation preinitiation complex; translational initiation; formation of cytoplasmic translation initiation complex
Sources:Amigo / QuickGO
Orthologs
Species	Human	Mouse
Entrez	1983	217869
Ensembl	ENSG00000100664	ENSMUSG00000021282
UniProt	P55010	P59325
RefSeq (mRNA)	NM_183004; NM_001969	NM_173363; NM_178041
RefSeq (protein)	NP_001960; NP_892116	NP_775539; NP_829887
Location (UCSC)	Chr 14: 103.33 – 103.35 Mb	Chr 12: 111.5 – 111.51 Mb
PubMed search
- Wikidata
View/Edit Human	View/Edit Mouse

Eukaryotic translation initiation factor 5 is a protein that in humans is encoded by the EIF5 gene.

EIF5 is a GTPase-activating protein.
