= BZW1 =

Protein-coding gene in humans

Identifiers
- Aliases: BZW1, BZAP45, Nbla10236, basic leucine zipper and W2 domains 1, 5MP2
- External IDs: MGI: 1914132; GeneCards: BZW1

Gene location (Human)
Chr.	Chromosome 2 (human)
Band	2q33.1	Start	200,810,594 bp
Band	2q33.1	End	200,827,338 bp

Gene location (Mouse)
Chr.	Chromosome 1 (mouse)
Band	1|1 C1.3	Start	58,432,057 bp
Band	1|1 C1.3	End	58,446,512 bp
RNA expression pattern
Bgee	Human / Mouse (ortholog); Top expressed in: palpebral conjunctiva; amniotic fluid; germinal epithelium; Epithelium of choroid plexus; gingival epithelium; parietal pleura; mucosa of paranasal sinus; stromal cell of endometrium; cartilage tissue; epithelium of nasopharynx / Top expressed in: endothelial cell of lymphatic vessel; renal corpuscle; somite; abdominal wall; primitive streak; maxillary prominence; mandibular prominence; ventricular zone; endocardial cushion; condyle; More reference expression data
BioGPS	n/a
Gene ontology
Molecular function	RNA binding; cadherin binding
Cellular component	cytoplasm; membrane
Biological process	regulation of transcription, DNA-templated; transcription, DNA-templated
Sources:Amigo / QuickGO
Orthologs
Databases	NCBI: entry; OMA: entry
Species	Human	Mouse
Entrez	9689	66882
Ensembl	ENSG00000082153	ENSMUSG00000051223
UniProt	Q7L1Q6	Q9CQC6
RefSeq (mRNA)	NM_001207067; NM_001207068; NM_001207069; NM_014670; NM_001321688 NM_001321690; NM_001321691; NM_001321693; NM_001321694	NM_025824
RefSeq (protein)	NP_001193996; NP_001193997; NP_001193998; NP_001308617; NP_001308619 NP_001308620; NP_001308622; NP_001308623; NP_055485	NP_080100
Location (UCSC)	Chr 2: 200.81 – 200.83 Mb	Chr 1: 58.43 – 58.45 Mb
PubMed search
- Wikidata
View/Edit Human	View/Edit Mouse

Basic leucine zipper and W2 domain-containing protein 1 is a protein that in humans is encoded by the BZW1 gene and expressed in the nucleus. It enables RNA and cadherin binding activity.

Salivary gland carcinoma and eastern equine encephalitis are associated with BZW1.

== Interactions ==
BZW1 has been shown to interact with PSTPIP1 and CDC5L.
