= Inflammatory bowel disease =

Inflammatory bowel diseases
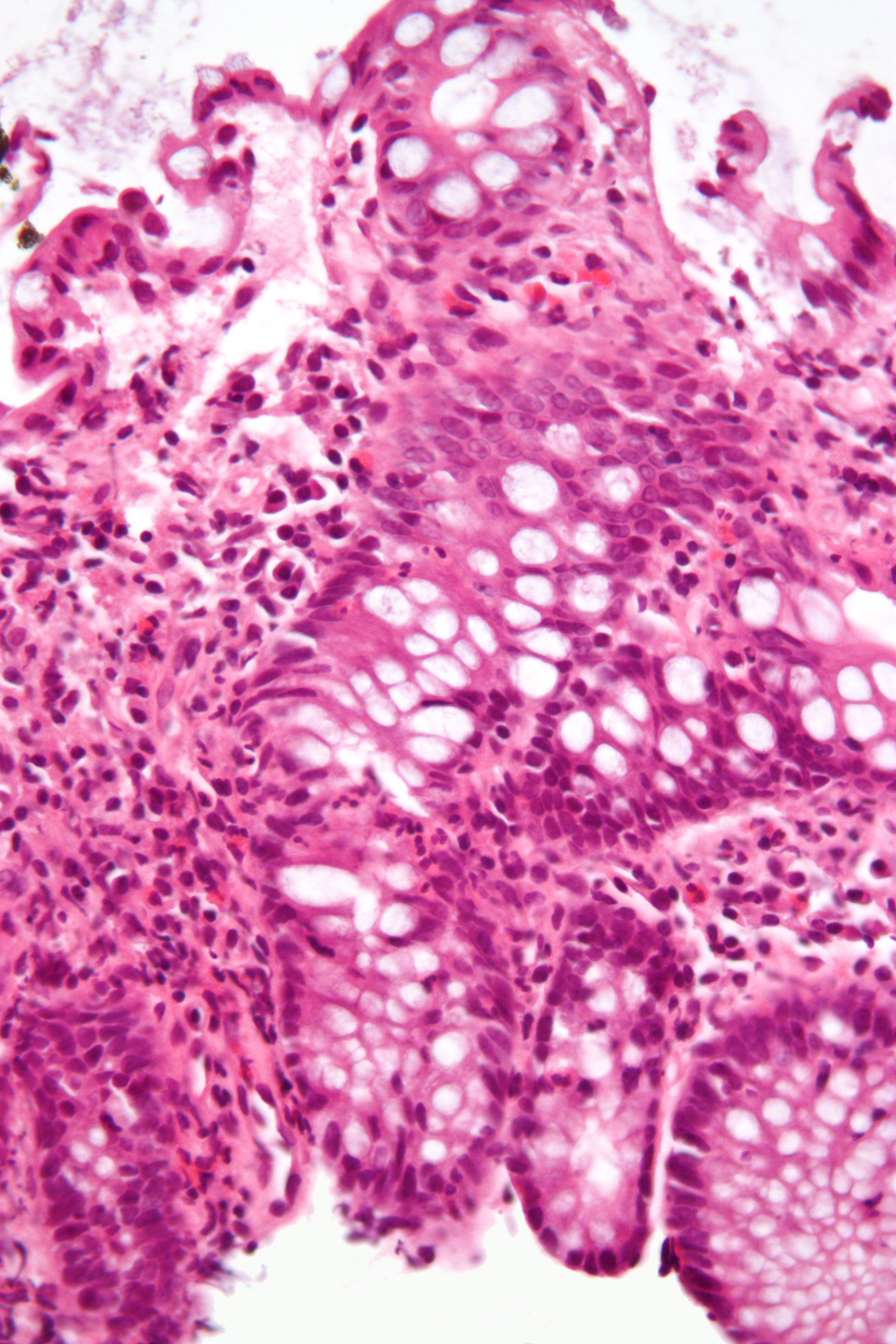
- Micrograph showing inflammation of the large bowel in a case of inflammatory bowel disease. Colonic biopsy. H&E stain.
- Specialty: Gastroenterology
- Differential diagnosis: Gastroenteritis, irritable bowel syndrome, celiac disease
- Frequency: 11.2 million worldwide (2015)
- Deaths: 47,400 worldwide (2015)

Inflammatory bowel disease (IBD) is a group of inflammatory conditions of the colon and small intestine, with Crohn's disease and ulcerative colitis (UC) being the principal types. Crohn's disease affects the small intestine and large intestine, as well as the mouth, esophagus, stomach and the anus, whereas UC primarily affects the colon and the rectum.

== Signs and symptoms ==
Signs and symptoms
	Crohn's disease	Ulcerative colitis
Defecation	Often porridge-like, sometimes steatorrhea	Often mucus-like and with blood
Tenesmus	Less common	More common
Fever	Common	Indicates severe disease
Fistulae	Common	Seldom
Weight loss	Often	More seldom

In spite of Crohn's and UC being distinct diseases, both may present with any of the following symptoms: abdominal pain, diarrhea, rectal bleeding, severe internal cramps/muscle spasms in the region of the pelvis and weight loss. Anemia is the most prevalent extraintestinal complication of inflammatory bowel disease (IBD). Associated complaints or diseases include arthritis, pyoderma gangrenosum, primary sclerosing cholangitis, and non-thyroidal illness syndrome (NTIS). Associations with deep vein thrombosis (DVT) and bronchiolitis obliterans organizing pneumonia (BOOP) have also been reported. Diagnosis is generally by assessment of inflammatory markers in stool followed by colonoscopy with biopsy of pathological lesions.

Diagnostic findings
	Crohn's disease	Ulcerative colitis
Terminal ileum involvement	Commonly	Seldom
Colon involvement	Usually	Always
Rectum involvement	Seldom	Usually (95%)
Involvement around the anus	Common	Seldom
Bile duct involvement	No increase in rate of primary sclerosing cholangitis	Higher rate
Distribution of disease	Patchy areas of inflammation (skip lesions)	Continuous area of inflammation
Endoscopy	Deep geographic and serpiginous (snake-like) ulcers	Continuous ulcer
Depth of inflammation	May be transmural, deep into tissues	Shallow, mucosal
Stenosis	Common	Seldom
Granulomas on biopsy	May have non-necrotizing non-peri-intestinal crypt granulomas	Non-peri-intestinal crypt granulomas not seen

== Causes ==
Pathophysiology
	Crohn's disease	Ulcerative colitis
Cytokine response	Associated with T_{h}17	Vaguely associated with T_{h}2

IBD is a complex disease which arises as a result of the interaction of environmental and genetic factors leading to immunological responses and inflammation in the intestine.

=== Diet ===
People living with IBD are keenly interested in diet, but little is known about the impact of diet on these patients. Recent reviews underlined the important role of nutritional counselling in IBD patients. Patients should be encouraged to adopt diets that are best supported by evidence and involve monitoring for the objective resolution of inflammation.

A 2022 study found that diets with increased intake of fruits and vegetables, reduction of processed meats and refined carbohydrates, and preference of water for hydration were associated with lower risk of active symptoms with IBD, although increased intake of fruits and vegetables alone did not reduce risk of symptoms with Crohn's disease. A 2022 scientific review also found generally positive outcomes for IBD patients who adhered to the Mediterranean diet (high fruit and vegetable intake).

Dietary patterns are associated with a risk for ulcerative colitis. In particular, subjects who were in the highest tertile of the healthy dietary pattern had a 79% lower risk of ulcerative colitis.

Gluten sensitivity is common in IBD and associated with having flareups. Gluten sensitivity was reported in 23.6% and 27.3% of Crohn's disease and ulcerative colitis patients, respectively.

A diet high in protein, particularly animal protein, and/or high in sugar may be associated with increased risk of IBD and relapses.

=== Bile acids ===
Emerging evidence indicates that bile acids are important etiological agents in IBD pathogenesis. IBD patients have a consistent pattern of an increased abundance of primary bile acids such as cholic acid and chenodeoxycholic acid (and their conjugated forms), and a decreased abundance of secondary bile acids such as lithocholic acid and deoxycholic acid.

=== Microbiota ===
The human microbiota consists of 10–100 trillion microorganisms. Several studies have confirmed that the microbiota composition is different in patients with IBD compared to healthy individuals. This difference is more pronounced in patients with Crohn's disease than in those with ulcerative colitis. In IBD patients, there is a decrease or absence of beneficial bacteria such as Bifidobacterium longum, Eubacterium rectale, Faecalibacterium prausnitzii, and Roseburia intestinalis, while harmful species like Bacteroides fragilis, Ruminococcus torques, and Ruminococcus are more abundant. The activation of reactive oxygen species and reactive nitrogen species leads to oxidative stress for both host cells and the gut microbiome. Consequently, in IBD, there is a microbial imbalance, known as dysbiosis, characterized by an increase in functional pathways involved in the microbial response to oxidative stress. This oxidative stress can promote the growth of certain species such as R. gnavus. Another opportunistic bacterium called A. muciniphila contributes to IBD development and is more prevalent in individuals lacking NOD-like receptor 6 (NLRP6). Both R. gnavus and A. muciniphila are bacterial species that are more abundant in IBD. Patients with IBD often exhibit stronger antibody and T-cell responses to microbial antigens. The gut microbiome employs various approaches to interact with the host immune system. For instance, B. fragilis, which is symbiotic in humans, can transfer immune regulatory molecules to immune cells through the secretion of outer membrane vesicles. This mechanism plays a protective role in IBD by activating the non-classical autophagy pathway, dependent on Atg16L1 and NOD2 genes. B. thetaiotaomicron induces the differentiation of T regulatory cells (Tregs) to modulate gut immunity, thus increasing the expression of Gata3 and FoxP3 genes. The colonization of Clostridium spp. can enhance the aggregation of RORγT+ FOXP3 Treg cells, which inhibit the development of Th2 and Th17 cells. Ultimately, this colonization could decrease the response of colonic Th2 and Th17 cells. Also F. prausnitzii attracts CD4 and CD8a (DP8α) regulatory T cells. E. coli Nissle 1917 has the capability to inhibit the growth of Salmonella and other harmful bacteria. It prevents these pathogens from adhering to and invading intestinal epithelial cells, which significantly reduces the likelihood of inflammation in the gut and may also prevent the onset of IBD.

=== Breach of intestinal barrier ===
Loss of integrity of the intestinal epithelium plays a key pathogenic role in IBD. Dysfunction of the innate immune system as a result of abnormal signaling through immune receptors called toll-like receptors (TLRs)—which activates an immune response to molecules that are broadly shared by multiple pathogens—contributes to acute and chronic inflammatory processes in IBD colitis and associated cancer. Changes in the composition of the intestinal microbiota are an important environmental factor in the development of IBD. Detrimental changes in the intestinal microbiota induce an inappropriate (uncontrolled) immune response that results in damage to the intestinal epithelium. Breaches in this critical barrier (the intestinal epithelium) allow further infiltration of microbiota that, in turn, elicit further immune responses. IBD is a multifactorial disease that is nonetheless driven in part by an exaggerated immune response to gut microbiota that causes defects in epithelial barrier function.

=== Oxidative stress and DNA damage ===
Oxidative stress and DNA damage likely have a role in the pathophysiology of IBD. Oxidative DNA damage as measured by 8-OHdG levels was found to be significantly increased in people with IBD compared to healthy controls, and in inflamed mucosa compared with noninflamed mucosa. Antioxidant capacity as measured by the total action of all antioxidants detected in blood plasma or body fluids was found to be significantly decreased in people with IBD compared to healthy controls, and in inflamed mucosa compared with noninflamed mucosa.

== Genetics ==
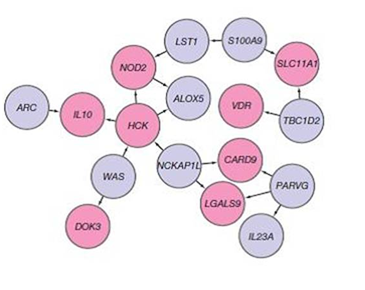
Associated loci pane. Pink genes are in IBD associated loci, blue are not.

A genetic component to IBD has been recognized for over a century. Research that has contributed to understanding of the genetics include studies of ethnic groups (e.g., Ashkenazi Jews, Irish), familial clustering, epidemiological studies, and twin studies. With the advent of molecular genetics, understanding of the genetic basis has expanded considerably, particularly in the past decade. The first gene linked to IBD was NOD2 in 2001.

Genome-wide association studies have since added to understanding of the genomics and pathogenesis of the disease. More than 200 single nucleotide polymorphisms (SNPs or "snips") are now known to be associated with susceptibility to IBD. One of the largest genetic studies of IBD was published in 2012. The analysis explained more of the variance in Crohn's disease and ulcerative colitis than previously reported. The results suggested that commensal microbiota are altered in such a way that they act as pathogens in inflammatory bowel diseases. Other studies show that mutations in IBD-associated genes might interfere with the cellular activity and interactions with the microbiome that promote normal immune responses. Many studies identified that microRNAs dysregulation involved in IBD and to promote colorectal cancer. By 2020, single-cell RNA sequencing analysis was launched by a small consortium using IBD patient biopsy material in a search for therapeutic targets.

According to an article published on Nature, the ETS2 gene directs the macrophage inflammation that drives the disease.

== Diagnosis ==
The diagnosis is usually confirmed by biopsies on colonoscopy. Fecal calprotectin is useful as an initial investigation, which may suggest the possibility of IBD, as this test is sensitive but not specific for IBD.

=== Classification ===
Inflammatory bowel diseases are autoimmune diseases, in which the body's own immune system attacks elements of the digestive system. The chief types of IBD are Crohn's disease (CD) and ulcerative colitis (UC). Several other conditions are variously referred to either as being inflammatory bowel diseases or as being similar to but distinct from inflammatory bowel diseases. These conditions include:

- Microscopic colitis with subtypes
  - Collagenous colitis
  - Lymphocytic colitis
- Diversion colitis
- Behçet's disease

=== Differential diagnosis ===
Crohn's disease and ulcerative colitis are both common differential diagnoses for the other, and confidently diagnosing a patient with one of the two diseases may sometimes not be possible. No disease specific markers are currently known in the blood that would enable the reliable separation of patients with Crohn's disease and ulcerative colitis. Physicians tell the difference between Crohn's disease and UC by the location and nature of the inflammatory changes. Crohn's can affect any part of the gastrointestinal tract, from mouth to anus (skip lesions), although a majority of the cases start in the terminal ileum. Ulcerative colitis, in contrast, is restricted to the colon and the rectum. Microscopically, ulcerative colitis is restricted to the mucosa (epithelial lining of the gut), while Crohn's disease affects the full thickness of the bowel wall ("transmural lesions"). Lastly, Crohn's disease and ulcerative colitis present with extra-intestinal manifestations (such as liver problems, arthritis, skin manifestations and eye problems) in different proportions. In 10–15% of cases, a definitive diagnosis neither of Crohn's disease nor of ulcerative colitis can be made because of idiosyncrasies in the presentation. In these cases, a diagnosis of indeterminate colitis may be made.

Irritable bowel syndrome can present with similar symptoms as either disease, as can nonsteroidal anti-inflammatory drug (NSAID) enteritis and intestinal tuberculosis. Conditions that can be mistaken particularly for Crohn's disease include Behçet's disease and coeliac disease, while conditions that can be symptomatically similar to ulcerative colitis in particular include acute self-limiting colitis, amebic colitis, schistosomiasis and colon cancer. Other diseases may cause an increased excretion of fecal calprotectin, such as infectious diarrhea, untreated celiac disease, necrotizing enterocolitis, intestinal cystic fibrosis and neoplastic pediatric tumor cells.

Liver function tests are often elevated in IBD, and are often mild and generally return spontaneously to normal levels. The most relevant mechanisms of elevated liver functions tests in IBD are drug-induced hepatotoxicity and fatty liver. Conversely, low ALT levels are associated with greater IBD disease activity, probably reflecting malnourishment and sarcopenia.

== Treatment ==
Management
	Crohn's disease	Ulcerative colitis
Mesalazine	Less useful	More useful
Antibiotics	Effective in long-term	Generally not useful
Surgery	Often returns following removal of affected part	Usually cured by removal of colon

=== Surgery ===
CD and UC are chronic inflammatory diseases, and are not medically curable. However, ulcerative colitis can in most cases be cured by proctocolectomy, although this may not eliminate extra-intestinal symptoms. An ileostomy will collect feces in a bag. Alternatively, a pouch can be created from the small intestine; this serves as the rectum and prevents the need for a permanent ileostomy. Between one-quarter and one-half of patients with ileo-anal pouches do have to manage occasional or chronic pouchitis.

Surgery cannot cure Crohn's disease but may be needed to treat complications such as abscesses, strictures or fistulae. Severe cases may require surgery, such as bowel resection, strictureplasty or a temporary or permanent colostomy or ileostomy. In Crohn's disease, surgery involves removing the worst inflamed segments of the intestine and connecting the healthy regions, but unfortunately, it does not cure Crohn's or eliminate the disease. At some point after the first surgery, Crohn's disease can recur in the healthy parts of the intestine, usually at the resection site. (For example, if a patient with Crohn's disease has an ileocecal anastomosis, in which the caecum and terminal ileum are removed and the ileum is joined to the ascending colon, their Crohn's will nearly always flare-up near the anastomosis or in the rest of the ascending colon).

=== Medical therapies ===
Medical treatment of IBD is individualised to each patient. The choice of which drugs to use and by which route to administer them (oral, rectal, injection, infusion) depends on factors including the type, distribution, and severity of the patient's disease, as well as other historical and biochemical prognostic factors, and patient preferences. For example, mesalazine is more useful in ulcerative colitis than in Crohn's disease. Generally, depending on the level of severity, IBD may require immunosuppression to control the symptoms, with drugs such as prednisone, tumor necrosis factor inhibitors (TNF inhibitors), azathioprine, methotrexate, or 6-mercaptopurine.

Steroids, such as the glucocorticoid prednisone, are frequently used to control disease flares and were once acceptable as a maintenance drug. Biological therapy for inflammatory bowel disease, especially the TNF inhibitors, are used in people with more severe or resistant Crohn's disease and sometimes in ulcerative colitis.

Treatment is usually started by administering drugs with high anti-inflammatory effects, such as prednisone. Once the inflammation is successfully controlled, another drug to keep the disease in remission, such as mesalazine in UC, is the main treatment. If further treatment is required, a combination of an immunosuppressive drug (such as azathioprine) with mesalazine (which may also have an anti-inflammatory effect) may be needed, depending on the patient. Controlled release budesonide is used for mild ileal Crohn's disease.

=== Nutritional and dietetic therapies ===
Exclusive enteral nutrition (EEN) is a first-line therapy in pediatric Crohn's disease with weaker data in adults. Evidence supporting exclusive enteral nutrition in ulcerative colitis is lacking.

Nutritional deficiencies play a prominent role in IBD. Malabsorption, diarrhea, and GI blood loss are common features of IBD. Deficiencies of B vitamins, fat-soluble vitamins, essential fatty acids, and key minerals such as magnesium, zinc, and selenium are extremely common and benefit from replacement therapy. Low serum levels of alanine transaminase can be a marker of sarcopenia which is underdiagnosed in patients with IBD and associated with a higher disease activity.

Anemia is commonly present in both ulcerative colitis and Crohn's disease. Due to raised levels of inflammatory cytokines which lead to the increased expression of hepcidin, parenteral iron is the preferred treatment option as it bypasses the gastrointestinal system, has lower incidence of adverse events and enables quicker treatment. Hepcidin itself is also an anti-inflammatory agent. In the murine model very low levels of iron restrict hepcidin synthesis, worsening the inflammation that is present. Enteral nutrition has been found to be efficient to improve hemoglobin level in patients with IBD, especially combined with erythropoietin.

Gastrointestinal bleeding, occurring especially during ulcerative colitis relapse, can contribute to anemia when chronic, and may be life-threatening when acute. To limit the possible risk of dietary intake disturbing hemostasis in acute gastrointestinal bleeding, temporary fasting is often considered necessary in hospital settings. The effectiveness of this approach is unknown; a Cochrane review in 2016 found no published clinical trials including children.

Low levels of vitamin D are associated with crohn's disease and ulcerative colitis and people with more severe cases of inflammatory bowel disease often have lower vitamin D levels. It is not clear if vitamin D deficiency causes inflammatory bowel disease or is a symptom of the disease. There is some evidence that vitamin D supplementation therapy may be associated with improvements in scores for clinical inflammatory bowel disease activity and biochemical markers. Vitamin D treatment may be associated with less inflammatory bowel disease reoccurrence of symptoms (relapse). It is not clear if this treatment improves the person's quality of life or what the clinical response to vitamin D treatment. The ideal treatment regime and dose of vitamin D therapy has not been well enough studied.

Dietary interventions can be beneficial for symptom management. For mild to moderate Crohn's disease and ulcerative colitis, the Mediterranean diet has shown promise in reducing symptoms and inflammation. The Crohn's Disease Exclusion Diet (CDED) was developed to reduce symptoms and inflammation. The CD-TREAT diet is a diet designed to recreate the effects of exclusive enteral nutrition (EEN) by using whole foods. In 2016, it was suggested that the specific carbohydrate diet (SCD) can relieve symptoms, but later studies have shown it no more effective than the Mediterranean diet and much more restrictive. The low-FODMAP diet can reduce symptoms but does not decrease inflammatory markers. The IBD anti-inflammatory diet (IBD-AID) has been explored as a management option. The autoimmune protocol diet (AIP) has also shown some promise.

Dietary fiber interventions, such as psyllium supplementation (a mixture of soluble and insoluble fibers), may relieve symptoms as well as induce/maintain remission by altering the microbiome composition of the GI tract, thereby improving regulation of immune function, reducing inflammation, and helping to restore the intestinal mucosal lining.

=== Microbiome ===
There is preliminary evidence of an infectious contribution to IBD in some patients that may benefit from antibiotic therapy, such as with rifaximin. The evidence for a benefit of rifaximin is mostly limited to Crohn's disease with less convincing evidence supporting use in ulcerative colitis.

The use of oral probiotic supplements to modify the composition and behavior of the microbiome has been considered as a possible therapy for both induction and maintenance of remission in people with Crohn's disease and ulcerative colitis. A Cochrane review in 2020 did not find clear evidence of improved remission likelihood, nor lower adverse events, in people with Crohn's disease, following probiotic treatment.

For ulcerative colitis, there is low-certainty evidence that probiotic supplements may increase the probability of clinical remission. People receiving probiotics were 73% more likely to experience disease remission and over 2x as likely to report improvement in symptoms compared to those receiving a placebo, with no clear difference in minor or serious adverse effects. Although there was no clear evidence of greater remission when probiotic supplements were compared with 5‐aminosalicylic acid treatment as a monotherapy, the likelihood of remission was 22% higher if probiotics were used in combination with 5-aminosalicylic acid therapy. Whereas in people who are already in remission, it is unclear whether probiotics help to prevent future relapse, either as a monotherapy or combination therapy.

Fecal microbiota transplant is a relatively new treatment option for IBD which has been studied since 2010. Some preliminary studies have suggested benefits similar to those in Clostridioides difficile infection but a review of use in IBD shows that FMT is safe, but of variable efficacy. Systematic reviews showed that 33% of ulcerative colitis, and 50% of Crohn's disease patients reach clinical remission after fecal microbiota transplant.

=== Alternative medicine ===
Complementary and alternative medicine approaches have been used in inflammatory bowel disorders. Evidence from controlled studies of these therapies has been reviewed; risk of bias was quite heterogeneous. The best supportive evidence was found for herbal therapy, with Plantago ovata and curcumin in UC maintenance therapy, wormwood in CD, mind/body therapy and self-intervention in UC, and acupuncture in UC and CD.

=== Novel approaches ===
Stem cell therapy is undergoing research as a possible treatment for IBD. A review of studies suggests a promising role, although there are substantial challenges, including cost and characterization of effects, which limit the current use in clinical practice.

=== Psychological interventions ===
Patients with IBD have a higher prevalence of depressive and anxiety disorders compared to the general population, women with IBD are more likely than men to develop affective disorders since up to 65% of them may have depression and anxiety disorder. Currently, there is no evidence to recommend psychological treatment, such as psychotherapy, stress management and patient's education, to all adults with IBD in general. These treatments had no effect on quality of life, emotional well-being and disease activity. The need for these approaches should be individually assessed and further researched to identify subgroups and determine type of therapy that may benefit individuals with IBD. In adolescents population such treatments may be beneficial on quality of life and depression, although only short-term effects have been found, which also imposes the need for further research.

A meta analysis of interventions to improve mood (including talking therapy, antidepressants, and exercise) in people with IBD found that they reduced inflammatory markers such as C-reactive protein and faecal calprotectin. Psychological therapies reduced inflammation more than antidepressants or exercise.

== Treatment standards ==
Crohn's and Colitis Australia, the peak body for IBD in Australia, where prevalence is one of the highest in the world, reviewed the quality of care for patients admitted to Australian hospitals. They found that only one hospital met accepted standards for multidisciplinary care, but that care was improved with the availability of even minimal specialized services.

== Prognosis ==
Complications
		Crohn's disease	Ulcerative colitis
Nutrient deficiency		Higher risk	
Colon cancer risk		Slight	Considerable
Prevalence of extraintestinal complications
Iritis/uveitis	Females	2.2%	3.2%
Iritis/uveitis	Males	1.3%	0.9%
Primary sclerosing cholangitis	Females	0.3%	1%
Primary sclerosing cholangitis	Males	0.4%	3%
Ankylosing spondylitis	Females	0.7%	0.8%
Ankylosing spondylitis	Males	2.7%	1.5%
Pyoderma gangrenosum	Females	1.2%	0.8%
Pyoderma gangrenosum	Males	1.3%	0.7%
Erythema nodosum	Females	1.9%	2%
Erythema nodosum	Males	0.6%	0.7%

While IBD can limit quality of life because of pain, vomiting, and diarrhea, it is rarely fatal on its own. Fatalities due to complications such as toxic megacolon, bowel perforation and surgical complications are also rare. Fatigue is a common symptom of IBD and can be a burden.

Around one-third of individuals with IBD experience persistent gastrointestinal symptoms similar to irritable bowel syndrome (IBS) in the absence of objective evidence of disease activity. Despite enduring the side-effects of long-term therapies, this cohort has a quality of life that is not significantly different to that of individuals with uncontrolled, objectively active disease, and escalation of therapy to biological agents is typically ineffective in resolving their symptoms. The cause of these IBS-like symptoms is unclear, but it has been suggested that changes in the gut-brain axis, epithelial barrier dysfunction, and the gut flora may be partially responsible.

While patients of IBD do have an increased risk of colorectal cancer, this is usually caught much earlier than the general population in routine surveillance of the colon by colonoscopy, and therefore patients are much more likely to survive.

New evidence suggests that patients with IBD may have an elevated risk of endothelial dysfunction and coronary artery disease.

The goal of treatment is toward achieving remission, after which the patient is usually switched to a lighter drug with fewer potential side effects. Every so often, an acute resurgence of the original symptoms may appear; this is known as a "flare-up". Depending on the circumstances, it may go away on its own or require medication. The time between flare-ups may be anywhere from weeks to years, and varies wildly between patients – a few have never experienced a flare-up.

Life with IBD can be challenging; however, many with the condition lead relatively normal lives. IBD carries a psychological burden due to stigmatization of being diagnosed, leading to high levels of anxiety, depression, and a general reduction in the quality of life. Although living with IBD can be difficult, there are numerous resources available to help families navigate the ins and out of IBD, such as the Crohn's and Colitis Foundation of America (CCFA).

== Epidemiology ==
IBD resulted in a global total of 51,000 deaths in 2013 and 55,000 deaths in 1990. The increased incidence of IBD since World War II has been correlated to the increase in meat consumption worldwide, supporting the claim that animal protein intake is associated with IBD. However, there are many environmental risk factors that have been linked to the increased and decreased risk of IBD, such as smoking, air pollution and greenspace, urbanization and Westernization. Inflammatory bowel diseases are increasing in Europe. Incidence and prevalence of IBD has risen steadily for the last decades in Asia, which could be related changes in diet and other environmental factors.

Around 0.8% of people in the UK have IBD. Similarly, around 270,000 (0.7%) of people in Canada have IBD, with that number expected to rise to 400,000 (1%) by 2030.

== Research ==
The following treatment strategies are not used routinely, but appear promising in some forms of IBD.

Initial reports suggest that helminthic therapy may not only prevent but even control IBD: a drink with roughly 2,500 ova of the Trichuris suis helminth taken twice monthly decreased symptoms markedly in many patients. It is even speculated that an effective "immunization" procedure could be developed—by ingesting the cocktail at an early age.

Prebiotics and probiotics are focusing increasing interest as treatments for IBD. Currently, there is evidence to support the use of certain probiotics in addition to standard treatments in people with ulcerative colitis but there is no sufficient data to recommend probiotics in people with Crohn's disease. Both single strain and multi-strain probiotics have been researched for mild to moderate cases of ulcerative colitis. The most clinically researched multi-strain probiotic with over 70 human trials is the De Simone Formulation. The specific probiotic strains, strain combinations and prebiotic substances suited to therapies of intestinal inflammation have not been identified.

Currently, the probiotic strain, frequency, dose and duration of the probiotic therapy are not established. In severely ill people with IBD there is a risk of the passage of viable bacteria from the gastrointestinal tract to the internal organs (bacterial translocation) and subsequent bacteremia, which can cause serious adverse health consequences. Live bacteria might not be essential because of beneficial effects of probiotics seems to be mediated by their DNA and by secreted soluble factors, and their therapeutic effects may be obtained by systemic administration rather than oral administration.

In 2005 New Scientist published a joint study by Bristol University and the University of Bath on the apparent healing power of cannabis on IBD. Reports that cannabis eased IBD symptoms indicated the possible existence of cannabinoid receptors in the intestinal lining, which respond to molecules in the plant-derived chemicals. CB1 cannabinoid receptors – which are known to be present in the brain – exist in the endothelial cells which line the gut, it is thought that they are involved in repairing the lining of the gut when damaged.

The team deliberately damaged the cells to cause inflammation of the gut lining and then added synthetically produced cannabinoids; the result was that gut started to heal: the broken cells were repaired and brought back closer together to mend the tears. It is believed that in a healthy gut, natural endogenous cannabinoids are released from endothelial cells when they are injured, which then bind to the CB1 receptors. The process appears to set off a wound-healing reaction, and when people use cannabis, the cannabinoids bind to these receptors in the same way.

Previous studies have shown that CB1 receptors located on the nerve cells in the gut respond to cannabinoids by slowing gut motility, therefore reducing the painful muscle contractions associated with diarrhea. CB2, another cannabinoid receptor predominantly expressed by immune cells, was detected in the gut of people with IBD at a higher concentration. These receptors, which also respond to chemicals in cannabis, appear to be associated with apoptosis – programmed cell death – and may have a role in suppressing the overactive immune system and reducing inflammation by mopping up excess cells.

Activation of the endocannabinoid system was found efficient in ameliorating colitis and increasing the survival rate of mice, and reducing remote organ changes induced by colitis, further suggest that modulation of this system is a potential therapeutic approach for IBDs and the associated remote organ lesions.

Alicaforsen is a first generation antisense oligodeoxynucleotide designed to bind specifically to the human ICAM-1 messenger RNA through Watson-Crick base pair interactions in order to subdue expression of ICAM-1. ICAM-1 propagates an inflammatory response promoting the extravasation and activation of leukocytes (white blood cells) into inflamed tissue. Increased expression of ICAM-1 has been observed within the inflamed intestinal mucosa of people with ulcerative colitis, pouchitis and Crohn's, where ICAM-1 over production correlated with disease activity. This suggests that ICAM-1 is a potential therapeutic target in the treatment of these diseases.

Cannabinoid CB2 receptor agonists are found to decrease the induction of ICAM-1 and VCAM-1 surface expression in human brain tissues and primary human brain endothelial cells (BMVEC) exposed to various pro-inflammatory mediators.

In 2014, an alliance among the Broad Institute, Amgen and Massachusetts General Hospital formed with the intention to "collect and analyze patient DNA samples to identify and further validate genetic targets."

In 2015, a meta-analysis on 938 IBD patients and 953 controls, IBD was significantly associated with having higher odds of vitamin D deficiency.

Gram-positive bacteria present in the lumen could be associated with extending the time of relapse for ulcerative colitis.

Bidirectional pathways between depression and IBD have been suggested and psychological processes have been demonstrated to influence self-perceived physical and psychological health over time. IBD-disease activity may impact quality of life and over time may significantly affect individual's mental well-being, which may be related to the increased risk to develop anxiety and/or depression. On the other hand, psychological distress may also influence IBD activity.

Higher rates of anxiety and depression are observed among those with IBD compared to healthy individuals, which correlated with disease severity. Part of this phenotypic correlation is due to a shared genetic overlap between IBD and psychiatric comorbidities. Moreover, anxiety and depression rates increase during active disease compared with inactive phases.

Flu vaccines are recommended for people with IBD in the UK; however, research suggests that vaccine uptake is low. Researchers analyzed data on 13,631 adults with IBD on immune-suppressing drugs during the 2018 – 2019 flu season. Only half of this population received a vaccine during this period and few (32%) were vaccinated before the flu circulated in the community. This could be due to the belief that flu vaccines cause IBD flares; however, the same study did not find a link between vaccination and IBD flares.

== In other species ==
IBD also occurs in dogs and is thought to arise from a combination of host genetics, intestinal microenvironment, environmental components and the immune system. There is an ongoing discussion, however, that the term "chronic enteropathy" might be better to use than "inflammatory bowel disease" in dogs because it differs from IBD in humans in how the dogs respond to treatment. For example, many dogs respond to only dietary changes compared to humans with IBD, who often need immunosuppressive treatment. Some dogs may also need immunosuppressant or antibiotic treatment when dietary changes are not enough. After having excluded other diseases that can lead to vomiting, diarrhea, and abdominal pain in dogs, intestinal biopsies are often performed to investigate what kind of inflammation is occurring (lymphoplasmacytic, eosinophilic, or granulomatous). In dogs, low levels of cobalamin in the blood have been shown to be a risk factor for negative outcome.

== See also ==
- Inflammatory bowel disease-22
- World Inflammatory Bowel Disease Day
