= Chemical colitis =

Inflammation of colon due to contact with a chemical

Chemical colitis is a type of colitis, an inflammation of the large intestine or colon, caused by the introduction of harsh chemicals to the colon by an enema or other procedure.

Soap enemas have been implicated in chemical colitis. Other chemicals that may lead to chemical colitis (introduced into the colon either unintentionally or intentionally as part of a medical procedure) include alcohol, radiocontrast agents, glutaraldehyde (used to disinfect surfaces and sterilize medical equipment), formalin (often used as a disinfectant), ergotamine (suppository for migraine headaches), hydrofluoric acid, sulfuric acid, acetic acid, ammonia, soap, sodium hydroxide, hydrogen peroxide, herbal medicines, chloroxylenol and potassium permanganate. Harsh chemicals, such as compounds used to clean colonoscopes, are sometimes accidentally introduced into the colon during colonoscopy leading to chemical colitis. Sometimes chemicals are purposefully introduced into the colon during sexual activities, suicide attempts or during colon cleanses that lead to chemical colitis.

The symptoms of chemical colitis are non-specific and may include diarrhea, rectal bleeding and abdominal pain. Symptoms of colitis are assessed using the Simple Clinical Colitis Activity Index.

In a small case series, the colon inflammation seen using colonoscopy in cases of chemical colitis due to glutaraldehyde was non-specific and similar to inflammation seen in ischemic colitis, inflammatory bowel disease or infectious colitis.

The incidence of chemical colitis is not known but it is believed to be a rare occurrence. In a population based observational study, glycerin enemas used for constipation had an incidence of ischemic colitis of 0.23% in an emergency department population. The mean age of those experiencing ischemic colitis after a glycerin enema was 70 years, and the mean time to ischemic colitis onset was 5.5 hours after enema administration.

Chemical colitis may trigger a flare of ulcerative colitis or Crohn's colitis.

Treatment is usually with supportive care until the colitis resolves. But in severe cases of chemical colitis with extensive injury, especially in cases with highly caustic substances, a colectomy (surgical removal of the damaged portion of the colon) is sometimes required.
