= Serum-derived bovine immunoglobulin/protein isolate =

Medical food product

Serum-derived bovine immunoglobulin/protein isolate (SBI) is a medical food product derived from bovine serum obtained from adult cows in the United States. It is sold under the name EnteraGam.

EnteraGam (SBI) is intended for the dietary management of chronic diarrhea and loose stools. It must be administered under medical supervision. It is used to manage chronic loose or frequent stools in any condition or disease where diarrhea is chronically present, such as in patients with diarrhea-predominant irritable bowel syndrome (IBS-D), inflammatory bowel disease (IBD), small intestinal bacterial overgrowth (SIBO), recurrent Clostridioides difficile-infection associated diarrhea, microscopic colitis or HIV-related enteropathy as well as many other diseases and conditions resulting in chronic diarrhea. EnteraGam is manufactured by Entera Health and distributed by RedHill Biopharma.

The overall AE rate (Adverse Events rate) is less than 0.4%. The most common AEs reported by patients administered EnteraGam include mild constipation (23), headache (13), mild diarrhea (11), nausea (8), abdominal pain (8), abdominal distention (7), and hives (7).

== Mechanism of Action ==
Unlike common dietary proteins, SBI contains a concentrated source of ~60 immunoglobulin (>50% IgG, 1% IgA, and 5% IgM), 5% albumin and other proteins and peptides that may aid in the management of chronic diarrhea or loose and frequent stools. Immunoglobulins found in SBI have been shown to bind to microbial components with immune-activating potential from a variety of bacteria, fungi and viruses, including those implicated in human disease. The putative mechanism of action features, this binding of inflammatory antigens may prevent their passage into the lamina propria of the bowel wall, presumably due steric exclusion. The resultant dampening of immune response in the gut-associated lymphoid tissue (GALT) is believed to allow for restoration of intestinal homeostasis, leading to resumption of normal gut function and nutrient absorption.

The therapeutic effect of SBI's action on various GI conditions with chronic diarrhea provides a specific nutritional benefit that cannot be provided by normal dietary proteins alone or by increased intake of foods which contain immunoglobulin (i.e., meat, dairy).

== Medical uses ==
In humans, oral immunoglobulins may improve function in the gastrointestinal (GI) tract. Conditions like HIV-enteropathy, IBS-D (irritable bowel syndrome with diarrhea), SIBO (small intestine bacterial overgrowth), recurrent C. difficile infection-associated diarrhea and post-infectious IBS-D often limit or impair the body's ability to absorb and digest select nutrients including water. Clinical studies have indicated that serum-derived bovine immunoglobulin/protein isolate may help to reduce diarrhea and to restore the ability of the GI tract to properly absorb and utilize those nutrients.

== History ==
Research into bovine- and porcine-associated sources of immunoglobulin began in the field of animal health. Studies examined the health effects of adding immunoglobulins to the feed of early-weaned piglets that had developed intestinal inflammation, intestinal barrier dysfunction, and general malnutrition causing the piglets not to thrive. These issues often manifested in diarrhea, dehydration, and death for young piglets. The addition of immunoglobulin-rich protein isolates to the piglets' food improved digestion, metabolism, and feed intake, increasing lean muscle mass and protein utilization. Gastric infection and diarrhea were also reduced in the post-weaning phase.
