= World Inflammatory Bowel Disease Day =

International awareness day for Crohn's disease and ulcerative colitis

World Inflammatory Bowel Disease Day, also known as World IBD Day, is an annual event to raise awareness of Crohn's disease and ulcerative colitis, known collectively as inflammatory bowel disease. The day is coordinated by the European Federation of Crohn's and Ulcerative Colitis Associations (EFCCA). It was created in 2010 during Digestive Disease Week in the United States and takes place on 19 May.
