= Collagenous colitis =

- Micrograph of collagenous colitis. H&E stain.
- Specialty: Gastroenterology

Collagenous colitis is an inflammatory condition of the colon. Together with the related condition lymphocytic colitis, it is a subtype of microscopic colitis, which is characterized by inflammation that specifically affects the colon (i.e. colitis), and a clinical presentation that involves watery diarrhea but a lack of rectal bleeding. Microscopic colitis does not usually cause macroscopic changes to the colon that allow a visual diagnosis during colonoscopy, instead causing microscopic changes that can be detected through histopathological examination of colonic biopsies. The nature of these microscopic changes is what differentiates collagenous from lymphocytic colitis, with the characteristic finding in collagenous colitis being depositions of collagen in the connective tissue between the colonic glands. Collagenous colitis, and microscopic colitis as a whole, is sometimes considered to be an inflammatory bowel disease (IBD) along with Crohn's disease and ulcerative colitis. However, little is known about the etiology of microscopic colitis, and so the degree of similarity to the inflammatory bowel diseases is uncertain.

Although cases are known to occur in all age groups, the disease is most frequently diagnosed in late middle aged or elderly people, with the average person being diagnosed in their 60s. Women are more frequently affected than men, with different studies finding female-male incidence ratios of between 3 and 8. Epidemiological studies have found large increases in diagnosed cases of microscopic colitis, of which collagenous colitis cases are a majority, over the past few decades, with cases of microscopic colitis now outnumbering those of Crohn's disease and ulcerative colitis at least in some regions.

== Signs and symptoms ==
In general, microscopic colitis causes chronic watery diarrhea with increased stool frequency. Some patients report nocturnal diarrhea, abdominal pain, bowel urgency, fecal incontinence, fatigue and weight loss. In severe cases, symptoms may include dehydration and electrolyte imbalances. Patients report a significantly diminished quality of life. In a retrospective study specifically on collagenous colitis patients, all studied patients experienced chronic diarrhea, 42% experienced weight loss, 41% experienced abdominal pain, 27% of the patients experienced nocturnal diarrhea, while 14% experienced fatigue and 8% experienced meteorism. The median patient had 6 stools per day. Among the patients who experienced weight loss and whose magnitude of weight loss was recorded, the median lost weight was 6 kg.

== Causes ==
The cause of collagenous colitis is unknown. A connection with autoimmune disorders such as celiac disease is suspected, as up to 40% of patients with collagenous colitis have an autoimmune disease. Use of nonsteroidal anti-inflammatory drugs (NSAIDs), proton pump inhibitors (PPIs), and beta blockers also appears to increase the risk of collagenous colitis, but the cause of this is not known.

== Diagnosis ==
On colonoscopy, the mucosa of the colon typically looks normal, but biopsies of affected tissue usually show deposition of collagen in the lamina propria, which is the area of connective tissue between colonic glands. Radiological tests, such as a barium enema, are also typically normal.

== Treatment ==
First-line treatment for collagenous colitis is the use of budesonide, a steroid that works locally in the colon and is highly cleared by first pass effect. Other medications that can be used include the following:

- Bismuth agents, including Pepto-Bismol
- 5-aminosalicylic acid
- Immunosuppressants, including azathioprine
- Infliximab

Pilot-scale studies have shown some evidence of possible benefit for both Boswellia serrata extract and specific strains of probiotics in the treatment of collagenous colitis, although larger sample sizes are needed to confirm the results.

== Epidemiology ==
One epidemiological study reported previous incidence rates of collagenous colitis found in the literature as ranging from 0.6 cases per 100,000 person-years (based on French data from 1987–1992) to 5.2 per 100,000 person-years (from an Icelandic study based on data from 1995–1999), while the authors themselves found an incidence rate of 3.1 per 100,000 person-years in Olmsted County, Minnesota across the period 1985–2001. Based only on the subset of the data from 1998–2001, however, the authors found a higher rate of 7.1 per 100,000 person-years, an incidence rate that exceeded those of Crohn's disease and ulcerative colitis. The previously mentioned Icelandic study also found increasing rates through the studied period, with the incidence rate in Iceland increasing from 2.2 in 1995 to 8.3 in 1999. Women appear to be more frequently affected by collagenous colitis than men, with the Icelandic study finding a female–male ratio of 7.9 in diagnosed cases and the Olmsted County study finding a female–male ratio of 4.4.

An updated study on microscopic colitis in Olmsted County, published in 2022 and based on data from between 2011 and 2019, found an incidence rate for collagenous colitis of 9.9 cases per 100,000 person-years, a prevalence of 100.1 per 100,000 persons, and a female–male ratio of 4.7. Unlike in the previous study on data from 1995–1999, the rate of collagenous colitis in Olmsted County was found to have remained stable between 2011 and 2019. Another study on rates of microscopic colitis in Denmark between 2001 and 2016 found an overall incidence rate for collagenous colitis of 12.2 per 100,000 person-years, a prevalence of 116.7 per 100,000 persons, and a female–male ratio of 3.1. Like the 1995–1999 Olmsted County study and the 1995–1999 Icelandic study, this Danish study found a heavy increase in rates of collagenous colitis and microscopic colitis overall during the studied period, with the incidence rates in 2001 and 2016 for microscopic colitis found to be, respectively, 2.3 and 24.3 cases per 100,000 person-years. However, the incidence rates of collagenous colitis in this Danish data peaked in 2011 with a rate of 19.6 cases per 100,000 person-years, and rates appeared to be stable between 2012 and 2016. The average age at diagnosis was found to be 67, and the highest incidence rate was found among patients over the age of 80. The strong increase in the case rates of microscopic colitis (with collagenous colitis making up 59% of these cases) throughout the study period meant that by 2016, microscopic colitis had a greater incidence rate in Denmark than did Crohn's disease and ulcerative colitis. The authors suggest an increase in the use of colonoscopies as a possible cause of the observed change in microscopic colitis diagnoses over time.
