= Mediterraneibacter torques =

Scientific classification
- Domain: Bacteria
- Kingdom: Bacillati
- Phylum: Bacillota
- Class: Clostridia
- Order: Eubacteriales
- Family: Lachnospiraceae
- Genus: Mediterraneibacter
- Species: M. torques

Binomial name
- Mediterraneibacter torques (Holdeman and Moore 1974) Togo et al. 2026

Type strain
- ATCC 27756; JCM 6553; VPI B2; VPI B2-51

Synonyms
- Ruminococcus torques Holdeman and Moore 1974

Species of anaerobic bacterium

Mediterraneibacter torques is a species of obligately anaerobic, Gram-positive bacterium in the family Lachnospiraceae. It is a member of the human gut microbiota and was originally isolated from human feces. Its cells are spherical to oval, occur in pairs or chains, and are non-motile. The species was formerly classified as Ruminococcus torques.

== Taxonomy ==
The species was described as Ruminococcus torques by Lillian V. Holdeman and W. E. C. Moore in 1974. Its transfer to the genus Mediterraneibacter was effectively published in 2018, and the combination Mediterraneibacter torques was validly published in 2026. Ruminococcus torques is consequently treated as a homotypic synonym.

The specific epithet torques is Latin for a twisted necklace, referring to the appearance of the chains formed in broth cultures.

== Mucin degradation ==
M. torques can use gastric and colonic mucin glycoproteins and their released O-linked oligosaccharides as growth substrates. Mucin degradation is mediated principally by secreted enzymes. The organism releases mucin-derived products that can be used by other intestinal bacteria, including Bacteroides thetaiotaomicron, and has consequently been described as a keystone mucin degrader. Increased abundance of the organism has also been reported in studies of inflammatory bowel disease.
