= Skip lesion =

Patchy wound or inflammation

A skip lesion is a wound or inflammation that is clearly patchy, "skipping" areas that thereby are unharmed. It is a typical form of intestinal damage in Crohn's disease, but may also be the kind of damage to the renal tubules in acute tubular necrosis. Rarely, it is a characteristic of temporal arteritis.
