= Inflammatory bowel disease-22 =

Genetic element in the species Homo sapiens

Inflammatory bowel disease-22 is a human phenotype with Mendelian Inheritance in Man (MIM) symbol IBD22 and associated with genetic locus 17q21.2 on the long arm of chromosome 17.

The phenotype may be associated with variation in STAT3 or ORMDL3 genes.
