= Simple clinical colitis activity index =

- Purpose: Determining severity of ulcerative colitis

The Simple Clinical Colitis Activity Index (SCCAI) is a diagnostic tool and questionnaire used to assess the severity of symptoms in people who suffer from ulcerative colitis. It was created in 1998 and is still used to assess the severity of symptoms. It is also used for research purposes to determine the efficacy of various treatments aimed at relieving symptoms. The calculated score ranges from 0 to 19, where active disease is a score of 5 or higher.

The score is determined by asking the person with colitis questions regarding:

- Bowel frequency at day/night
- Urgency of defecation
- Blood in stool
- General health
- Extracolonic manifestations
