= Lymphocytic colitis =

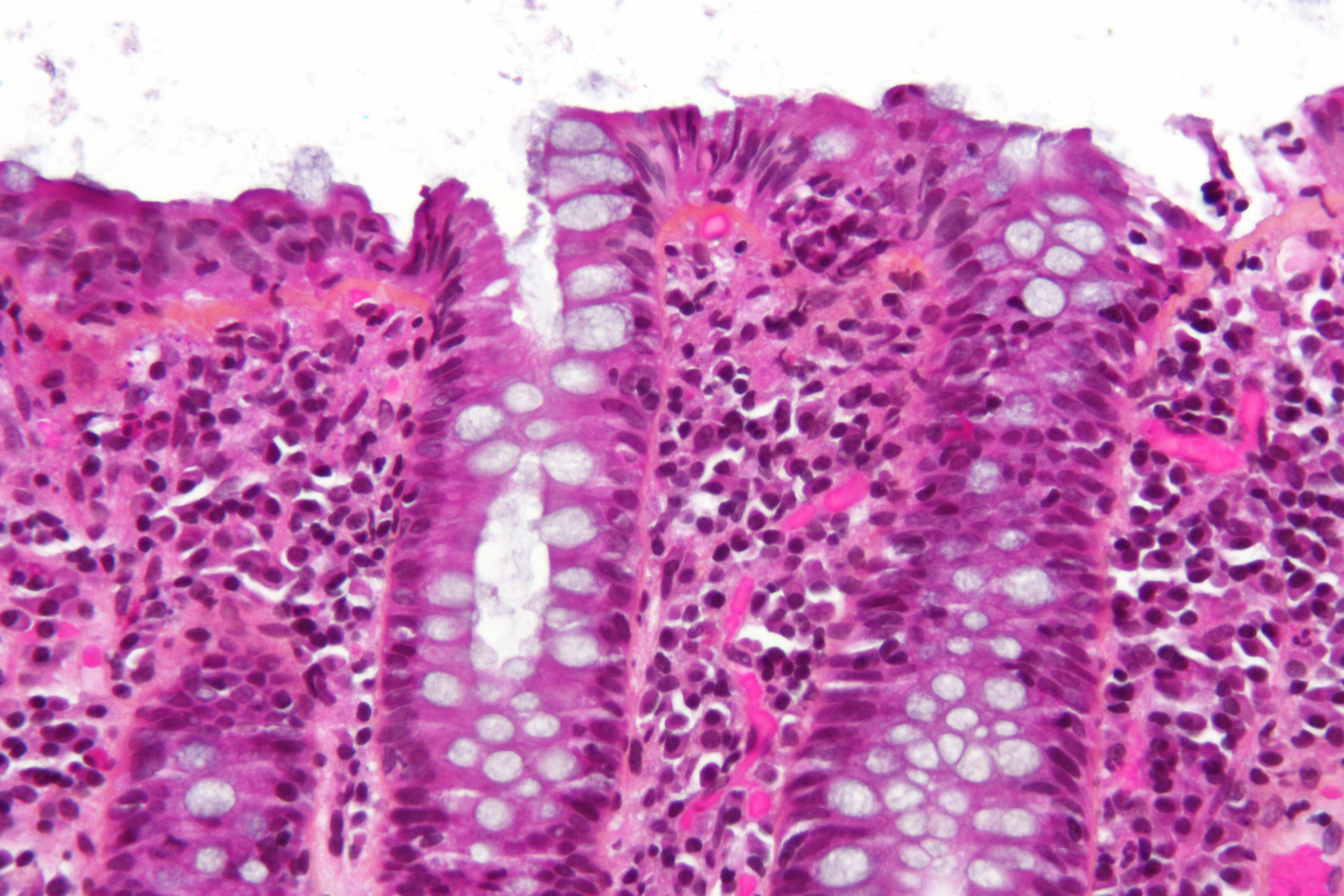
- Micrograph of lymphocytic colitis. HPS stain.
- Specialty: Gastroenterology

Lymphocytic colitis is a subtype of microscopic colitis, a condition characterized by chronic non-bloody watery diarrhea.

== Causes ==
No definite cause has been determined. The peak incidence of lymphocytic colitis is in persons over age 50; the disease affects twice as many women as men. Some reports have implicated long-term usage of NSAIDs, proton pump inhibitors, and selective serotonin reuptake inhibitors, and other drugs. Associations with other autoimmune disorders suggests that overactive immune responses occur.

== Diagnosis ==
The colonoscopy is normal but histology of the mucosal biopsy reveals an accumulation of lymphocytes in the colonic epithelium and connective tissue (lamina propria). Collagenous colitis shares this feature but additionally shows a distinctive thickening of the subepithelial collagen table.

== Treatment ==
Budesonide, in colonic release preparations, has been shown in randomized controlled trials to be effective in treating this disorder.

Over-the-counter antidiarrheal drugs may be effective for some people with lymphocytic colitis. Anti-inflammatory drugs, such as salicylates, mesalazine, and systemic corticosteroids may be prescribed for people who do not respond to other drug treatment. The long-term prognosis for this disease is good with a proportion of people suffering relapses which respond to treatment.

== History ==
Lymphocytic colitis was first described in 1989.

== See also ==
- Colitis
- Paratuberculosis
- Latent tuberculosis
