= Microscopic colitis =

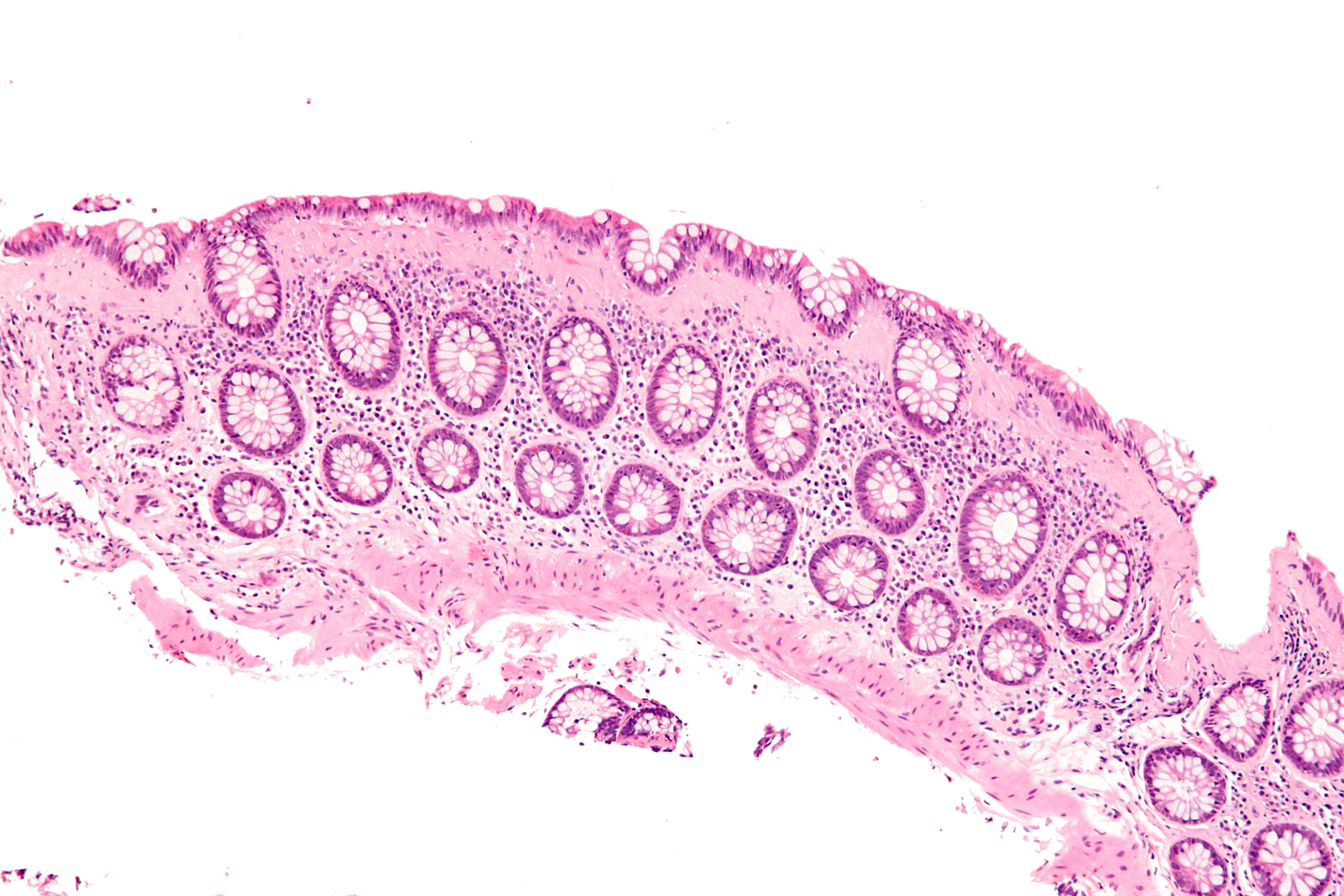
- Micrograph of collagenous colitis, a type of microscopic colitis. H&E stain.
- Specialty: Gastroenterology
- Symptoms: Persistent diarrhea
- Types: Lymphocytic colitis, collagenous colitis
- Diagnostic method: Endoscopic biopsy of colonic mucosa
- Differential diagnosis: Bile acid diarrhea, celiac disease, lactose malabsorption, Crohn's disease, ulcerative colitis, infectious colitis
- Medication: Loperamide, Bismuth subsalicylate, Budesonide
- Frequency: 103 cases per 100,000 persons

Microscopic colitis refers to two related medical conditions which cause diarrhea: collagenous colitis and lymphocytic colitis. Both conditions are characterized by the presence of chronic non-bloody watery diarrhea, normal appearances on colonoscopy and characteristic histopathology findings of inflammatory cells.

== Signs and symptoms ==
The main symptom is persistent non-bloody watery diarrhea, which may be profuse. People may also experience abdominal pain, fecal incontinence, and unintentional weight loss. Microscopic colitis is the diagnosis in around 10% of cases investigated for chronic non-bloody diarrhea.

=== Associated conditions ===
A higher incidence of autoimmune diseases, for example arthritis, Sjögren's disease, thyroid disorders, and celiac disease, has been reported in people with microscopic colitis. Associations with various drugs have been found, especially proton pump inhibitors, H_{2} blockers, selective serotonin reuptake inhibitors (SSRIs), and non-steroidal anti-inflammatory drugs (NSAIDs). Bile acid diarrhea is found in 41% of patients with collagenous colitis and 29% with lymphocytic colitis. Additionally, cigarette smoking has been identified as a significant risk factor of microscopic colitis.

== Diagnosis ==
Colonoscopic appearances are normal or near normal. As the changes are often patchy, an examination limited to the rectum may miss cases of microscopic colitis, and so a full colonoscopy is necessary. Multiple colonic biopsies are taken to make the diagnosis. Histological features of colonic biopsies indicating microscopic colitis are: greater than 20 intraepithelial lymphocytes per 100 epithelial cells and, additionally, 10-20 μm of a thickened subepithelial collagen band in collagenous colitis. Inflammation of the lamina propria, with mainly mononuclear cells, may be observed in collagenous colitis.

=== Pathology ===
Microscopic colitis is characterized by an increase in inflammatory cells, particularly lymphocytes, in colonic biopsies with an otherwise normal appearance and architecture of the colon. Inflammatory cells are increased both in the surface epithelium ("intraepithelial lymphocytes") and in the lamina propria. The key feature is more than 20 intra-epithelial lymphocytes per 100 epithelial cells. These are the principal features of lymphocytic colitis. An additional distinguishing feature of collagenous colitis is a thickened subepithelial collagen layer, which may be up to 30 micrometres thick, that occurs in addition to the features found in lymphocytic colitis. The fact that the two types of microscopic colitis share many features, including epidemiology, risk factors, and response to therapy, has led to the suggestion that they are actually subtypes of the same disease.

=== Differential diagnosis ===
Differential diagnoses, which should be ruled out, include bile acid diarrhea, lactose malabsorption, celiac disease, Crohn's disease, ulcerative colitis, and infectious colitis.

== Treatment ==
Lymphocytic and collagenous colitis have both been shown in randomized, placebo-controlled trials to respond well to budesonide, a glucocorticoid. Budesonide, formulated to be active in the distal colon and rectum is effective for both active disease and in the prevention of relapse. However, relapse occurs frequently after withdrawal of therapy.

Studies of several other agents including antidiarrheals, bismuth subsalicylate (Pepto-Bismol), mesalazine/mesalamine (alone or in combination with cholestyramine), systemic corticosteroids, cholestyramine, immunomodulators, and probiotics have shown to be less effective than budesonide for treating both forms of microscopic colitis.

Anti-TNF inhibitors, split ileostomy, diverting ileostomy, and subtotal colectomy are options for management of steroid-dependent or refractory microscopic colitis. Currently, the need to resort to surgery is limited considering the improvement of drug therapy options. However, surgery is still considered for patients with severe, unresponsive microscopic colitis.

== Prognosis ==
The prognosis for lymphocytic colitis and collagenous colitis is good, and both conditions are considered to be benign. The majority of people afflicted with the conditions recover from their diarrhea, and their histological abnormalities resolve, although relapses commonly occur if maintenance treatment is not continued.

== Epidemiology ==
Incidence and prevalence of microscopic colitis nears those of ulcerative colitis and Crohn's disease. Studies in North America found incidence rates of 7.1 per 100,000 person-years for collagenous colitis and 12.6 per 100,000 person-years for lymphocytic colitis. Prevalence has been estimated as 103 cases per 100,000 persons.

People who develop microscopic colitis are characteristically, though not exclusively, middle-aged females. The average age of diagnosis is 65, but 25% of cases are diagnosed below the age of 45.

== History ==
The condition of microscopic colitis was first described as such in 1982. Lymphocytic colitis was described in 1989. Collagenous colitis was recognised earlier, in 1976.
