= Garrett (surname) =

Garrett is a surname, and may refer to:

== A ==
- Abraham Ellison Garrett (1830–1907), American politician
- Ada Sawyer Garrett (1856–1938), American socialite
- Adrian Garrett (1943–2021), American baseball player and coach
- Agnes Garrett (1845–1935), English suffragist and interior designer
- Akala Garrett (born 2005), American track and field athlete
- Alexander Charles Garrett (1832—1924), American Episcopal bishop
- Allison Garrett (born 1964), American attorney, inventor and educator
- Almeida Garrett (1799–1854), Portuguese poet, playwright, novelist, and politician
- Alvin Garrett (born 1956), American football player
- Alvin Garrett (singer) (born c.1980), American musician, actor and social entrepreneur
- Amir Garrett (born 1992), American baseball player
- Amos Garrett (born 1941), American-Canadian musician and author
- Andrew Garrett (explorer) (1823–1887), American explorer, naturalist and illustrator
- Andrew Garrett (linguist), American linguist
- Andrew Takuya Garrett, American politician from Hawaii
- Archie Garrett (1919–1994), Scottish footballer
- Augustus Garrett (1801–1848), mayor of Chicago, Illinois from 1843 to 1844 and 1845 to 1846
- Avery Garrett (1916–1988), Washington State Senator

== B ==
- Beau Garrett (born 1982), American actress and model
- Bernard Garrett (1925–1999), American businessman, investor and banker
- Betty Garrett (1919–2011), American actress, comedian, singer, and dancer
- Bill Garrett (basketball) (1929–1974), American basketball player, coach, and college administrator
- Bill Garrett (golfer) (1940–2010), American golfer
- Billy Garrett (1933–1999), American racing driver
- Billy Garrett Jr. (born 1994) American basketball player and grandson of Bill Garrett
- Billy Garrett (politician) (born 1956), American lawyer and politician from South Carolina
- Bobby Garrett (1932–1987), American football player
- Brad Garrett (born 1960), American actor and comedian
- Bradley Garrett (born 1981), American geographer, writer and photographer
- Brandon Garrett (born 1975), American legal scholar
- Braxton Garrett (born 1997), American baseball player
- Budge Garrett (1893–1950), American football player

== C ==
- Calvin Garrett (born 1956), American basketball player
- Camryn Garrett (born 2000), American writer
- Carl Garrett (1947–2020), American football player
- Carla Garrett (born 1967), American weightlifter and discus thrower
- Charles Garrett (1901–1968), English cricketer and Royal Navy officer
- Charles Scott-Garrett (1881–1972), British chemist and archaeologist
- Cherrelle Garrett (born 1989), American bobsledder
- Christian Garrett, American venture capitalist investor
- Christina Hallowell Garrett (1876–1960), American academic and authority on the Marian exiles
- Christopher Garrett (born 1943), British oceanographer
- Christopher L. Garrett (born 1973), Associate Justice of the Oregon Supreme Court
- Chris Garrett (Canadian football) (born 1987), American-born Canadian football running back
- Chris Garrett (linebacker) (born 1998), American football linebacker
- Clare Pfeifer Garrett (1882–1946), American sculptor
- Clarence Garrett (1891–1977), American baseball pitcher
- Cliff Garrett (1908–1963), American founder of Garrett AiResearch
- Clyde L. Garrett (1885–1959), American politician from Texas
- Colin Garrett (born 2000), American racing driver
- Courtney Garrett (born 1992), American beauty pageant titleholder

== D ==
- Dan Garrett, American college football coach
- Daniel Garrett (died 1753), British architect
- Daniel E. Garrett (1869–1932), Texas State Senator
- Danny Garrett (born 1957), American politician
- Darrius Garrett (born 1990), American-Rwandan basketball player
- Dave Garrett, American sportscaster
- David Garrett (born 1980), German violinist
- David Garrett (politician) (born 1958), New Zealand Member of Parliament
- David Garrett (screenwriter), American filmmaker
- David C. Garrett Jr. (1922–2012), American businessman
- Davidson Garrett (born 1952), American poet and actor
- Dean Garrett (born 1966), American basketball player
- Denis Garrett (1906–1989), British mycologist and plant pathologist
- Diante Garrett (born 1988), American basketball player and coach
- Dick Garrett (born 1947), American basketball player
- Dickie Garrett (1865–1908), Welsh rugby union player
- Don Garrett (born 1953), American philosopher
- Donald Garrett (1932–1989), American jazz multi-instrumentalist
- Drake Garrett (born 1946), American football player
- Drew Garrett (born 1989), American actor
- Dub Garrett (1925–1976), American football player
- Dudley Garrett (1924–1944), Canadian ice hockey player

== E ==
- Eddie Garrett, American actor
- Edmund H. Garrett (1853–1929), American painter, illustrator, and author
- Edward Garrett (MP for Wallsend) (1920–1993), English MP for Wallsend
- Edward Garrett (MP for Lichfield and Great Grimsby) (1528–1590), English MP
- Edward Garrett (writer), Scottish writer and poet
- Edward J. Garrett (1918–1982), American business executive
- Eileen J. Garrett (1892–1970), Irish medium and parapsychologist
- Eliza Clark Garrett (1805–1855), American educator and philanthropist
- Elizabeth Garrett (1963–2016), American academic administrator
- Elizabeth Garrett (songwriter) (1885–1947), American musician
- Emma Garrett (c.1846–1893), American educator and activist
- Ephra Garrett (1923–2008), New Zealand social studies academic
- Eric Garrett (1931–2009), English operatic bass
- Essie Garrett (1947–2014), American ultramarathon runner

== F ==
- Fergus Garrett, English plantsman and garden designer
- Finis J. Garrett (1875–1956), American politician
- Francis L. Garrett (1919–1992), United States Navy chaplain
- Frank Douglas Garrett, American basketball player, marine and academic
- Franklin Garrett (1906–2000), American historian
- Fydell Edmund Garrett (1865–1907), British publicist, journalist and poet

== G ==
- Garet Garrett (1878–1954), American journalist and author
- Gemma Garrett (born 1981), British beauty pageant winner
- Gene Garrett (1925–1993), American tennis player
- Geoffrey Garrett (born 1948), Australian metallurgist
- Geoffrey Garrett, Australian political scientist, dean of the Wharton School of the University of Pennsylvania
- George Garrard (MP) (a.k.a. George Garrett) (1579–c. 1650), English politician
- George Garrett (MP) (died 1648), English alderman and Sheriff of London
- George Garrett (composer) (1834–1897), English organist and composer
- George Garrett (inventor) (1852–1902), English clergyman and inventor
- George A. Garrett (1888–1971), United States diplomat
- George Garrett (activist) (1896–1966), English labour activist and writer
- George Garrett (hurler) (1908–1969), Irish hurler
- George Garrett (poet) (1929–2008), American writer
- George Garrett (cricketer) (born 2000), English cricketer
- George Garrett (broadcaster), Canadian broadcast journalist
- George T. Garrett, United States Army officer
- Greg Garrett (baseball) (1947–2003), American baseball pitcher
- Greg Garrett (writer) (born 1961), American writer and professor

== H ==
- Hank Garrett (born 1931), American actor and comedian
- Harman Garrett (c.1610–c.1678), Niantic sachem
- Harry F. Garrett (1887–1971), American judge
- Haskell Garrett (born 1998), American football player
- Helen Garrett (1929–2006), Kentucky State Senator
- Henry Garrett (psychologist) (1894–1973), American psychologist and segregationist
- Henry Garrett (actor) (fl.2007), English actor
- Henry Beresford Garrett (1818–1885), New Zealand cooper and criminal
- Henry L. Garrett III (born 1939), U.S. Secretary of the Navy
- Herman Garrett (c.1607–c.1656), smith and landowner in colonial New England
- Hosea Garrett (1800–1888), American clergyman, philanthropist and university administrator
- Howard Garrett (born 1947), American radio talk show host and organic movement activist
- Howard F. Garrett (1918–1994), American politician from Missouri
- Hubert Garrett (1885–1915), Australian-English cricketer, son of Tom Garrett

== I ==
- Isaac P. Garrett (1844–1923), American politician from Pennsylvania

== J ==
- J.D. Garrett (1941–2012), American football player
- Jack Garrett (1914–1977), Irish politician
- Jake Garrett (born 2003), English footballer
- James P. Garrett (1922–2015), Oklahoma state court judge
- James Ramsey Garrett (1817–1855), Irish ornithologist
- James Rube Garrett Jr. (1922–2011), U.S. Marine and author of A Marine Diary
- James Leo Garrett Jr. (1925–2020), American professor of theology
- Jane Garrett (1973–2022), Australian politician
- Jane Dipika Garrett (born 2000), Nepalese beauty pageant titleholder
- Jarvis Garrett (born 1995), American basketball player
- Jason Garrett (born 1966), American football player and coach
- Jeremiah Learnoult Garrett (fl.1809), English dissenting minister
- Jeremy Garrett (born 2000), Guyanan footballer
- Jesse James Garrett, American user experience designer
- Jim Garrett (1930–2018), American football player, coach and scout
- Joan Sullivan Garrett (born 1949), American business executive
- John Garrett (Australian politician) (1805–1885), member of the New South Wales Legislative Assembly
- John Garrett (British politician) (1931–2007), British management consultant and politician
- John Garrett (American football) (born 1965), American football player and coach
- John Garrett (ice hockey) (born 1951), Canadian hockey player and sports commentator
- John Garrett (rower) (born 1963), British Olympic rower
- John Garrett (linguist) (1815–1893), British Wesleyan missionary in India
- John Raymond Garrett (born 1940), Australian-British photo journalist
- John Sidney Garrett (1921–2005), Louisiana state representative
- John W. Garrett (1820–1884), American businessman and philanthropist
- John W. Garrett (diplomat) (1872–1942), United States ambassador
- Johnny Garrett (politician) (born 1978), American attorney and politician from Tennessee
- Johnny Frank Garrett (1963–1992), death row prisoner executed by the State of Texas
- Jordan Garrett (born 1992), American actor
- Joseph Garrett or Stampy (born 1990), known online as stampylonghead, British YouTube personality
- Josh Garrett (born 1982), American athlete, hiker and veganism activist
- Joy Garrett (1945–1993), American actress and vocalist
- Joyce Finley Garrett (1931–1997), American diplomat
- Judd Garrett (born 1967), American football player
- Julian Garrett (1940–2026), Iowa State Senator
- Julio Garrett (1925–2018), Bolivian lawyer and politician

== K ==
- Katherine Garrett-Cox (born 1967), British business executive
- Kathleen Garrett, American actress and author
- Kelly Garrett (actress) (1944–2013), American actress and singer
- Kelly Garrett (singer) (1944–2013), American actress and singer
- Kenneth Garrett (born 1953), American photographer of archeology
- Kenny Garrett (born 1960), American jazz saxophonist and flautist
- Kevin Garrett (American football) (born 1980), American football player
- Kevin Garrett (musician) (born 1991), American musician
- Keyarris Garrett (born 1992), American football player

== L ==
- LaMonica Garrett (born 1975), American Slamball player and actor
- LaTanya Garrett, American politician from Michigan
- Laurie Garrett (born 1951), American science journalist and author
- Leah Garrett, American Hebraist and Jewish studies academic
- Lee Garrett (born 1948), American singer-songwriter
- Leif Garrett (born 1961), American musician and actor
- Len Garrett (born 1947), American football player
- Leonard Garrett (1936–2011), English footballer and cricketer
- Lesley Garrett (born 1955), English musician and broadcaster
- Lila Garrett (1925–2020), American television screenwriter and radio host
- Lillian Garrett-Groag, Argentine-American playwright, theater director and actress
- Lindsey Garrett, British social housing campaigner and political activist
- Lloyd Garrett (1886–1966), American singer, composer and lyricis.
- Luke Garrett (born 1995), Welsh rugby union player
- Lyrica Garrett (born 1950), American singer and actress

== M ==
- Major Garrett (born 1962), American journalist
- Malcolm Garrett (born 1956), British graphic designer
- Marcus Garrett (born 1998), American basketball player
- Margaret Garrett (born 1965), American artist and dancer
- Mark Garrett (born 1965), American rodeo cowboy
- Marvin Garrett (born 1963), American rodeo cowboy
- Mary Garrett (1854–1915), American suffragist and philanthropist
- Matilda Garrett (born 1998), Australian netball player
- Matthew Garrett, Irish technologist, programmer and free software activist
- Maude Garrett, Australian radio and television personality
- Maureen Garrett (born 1948), American actress
- Maureen Ruttle Garrett (1922–2011), English golfer
- Michael Garrett (astronomer) (born 1964), General Director of the Dutch astronomy research foundation ASTRON
- Michael Garrett (composer) (born 1944), British composer
- Michael Garrett (politician) (born c. 1985), American politician from North Carolina
- Mick Garrett (born 1937), Irish Gaelic footballer
- Michael X. Garrett (born 1961), U.S. Army general
- Michael Garrett (politician) (born c. 1985), member of the North Carolina State Senate
- Mike Garrett (born 1944), American football player
- Mike Garrett (punter) (born 1957), American football player
- Millicent Garrett, married name Millicent Fawcett (1847–1929), English political activist and writer
- Morgan Garrett (born 1985), American voice actress
- Myles Garrett (born 1995), American football player

== N ==
- Nahshon Garrett (born 1993), American wrestler
- Neil Garrett (born 1975), British TV producer and director
- Newson Garrett (1812–1893), English maltster
- Nick Garrett (bass-baritone) (born 1978), English songwriter, pianist, composer and arranger
- Nikki Garrett (born 1984), Australian golfer
- Norman Garrett, American bass-baritone opera singer
- Norman Garrett (automotive engineer), American automotive engineer

== O ==
- Oliver Garrett (1895–1979), American police officer
- Oliver H. P. Garrett (1894–1952), American film director and writer
- Otis Garrett (1905–1941), American film editor, screenwriter and film director

== P ==
- Pat Garrett (1850–1908), American lawman who killed Billy the Kid
- Patsy Garrett (1921–2015), American actress and singer
- Peter Garrett (born 1953), Australian musician, environmentalist, and politician

== R ==
- R. M. Garrett (1807–1885), American politician
- R. Norval Garrett (1904–1973), American college football coach
- Rachael D. Garrett, American geographer
- Ragnar Garrett (1900–1977), Australian Army commander
- Randall Garrett (1927–1987), American author
- Ray Garrett Jr. (1920–1980), American lawyer
- Raymond Garrett (1900–1994), Australian military officer
- Reed Garrett (born 1993), American baseball player
- Reggie Garrett (born 1951), American professional football player
- Rhoda Garrett (1841–1882), English suffragist and interior designer
- Richard Garrett (1755–1839), English manufacturer
- Richard Garrett (author) (1920–2008), English author
- Robert Garrett (1875–1961), American Olympic athlete
- Robert Garrett (British Army officer) (1794–1869), British Army lieutenant general
- Robert Garrett (footballer) (born 1988), Northern Ireland footballer
- Robert Garrett (basketball) (born 1977), German basketball player
- Roger Garrett (actor) (1940–2000), American actor
- Roger Garrett (snooker player), English snooker player
- Romeo B. Garrett (1910–2000), American sociologist
- Rowland Garrett (born 1950), American basketball player

== S ==
- Sam Garrett (born 1990), English singer and songwriter
- Sandy Garrett (born 1943), American politician
- Santana Garrett (born 1988), American wrestler and model
- Scott Garrett (born 1959), American politician
- Scott Garrett (musician), drummer for Pop's Cool Love, The Cult and Dag Nasty
- Sean Garrett (born 1979), American singer-songwriter and producer
- Shane Garrett (born 1967), American football player
- Shannon Garrett (born 1972), Canadian football player
- Shennette Garrett-Scott, American historian
- Si Garrett (1913–1967), American politician and attorney
- Siedah Garrett (born 1958), American singer-songwriter
- Snuff Garrett (1938–2015), American record producer
- Spencer Garrett (born 1963), American actor
- Static Major, birth name of Stephen Garrett (1974–2008), American singer-songwriter and producer, member of the group Playa
- Stephen Garrett (producer) (born 1957), British film and television producer
- Stone Garrett (born 1995), American baseball player
- Susan Garrett (born 1950), Illinois State Senator
- Susie Garrett (1929–2002), African American actress and singer

== T ==
- T. Scott Garrett (born 1956), American politician
- Ted Garrett (1920–1993), British politician
- Thea Garrett (born 1992), Maltese singer
- Thomas Garrett (1789–1871), American abolitionist
- Thomas Garrett (Australian politician) (1830–1891), New South Wales politician, newspaper proprietor and land agent
- Thomas Garrett (bishop) (died 1980), British-born Anglican bishop in the Church of South India
- Tommy Garrett (footballer) (1926–2006), English footballer
- Tommy Garrett (Nebraska politician) (born 1954), American politician from Nebraska
- Thomas A. Garrett (born 1962), American fast food restaurant executive
- Tom Garrett (Virginia politician) (born 1972), U.S. Representative from Virginia
- Tom Garrett (cricketer) (1858–1943), Australian cricketer
- Tommy Garrett (footballer) (1926–2006), English footballer
- Tommy Garrett (Nebraska politician) (born 1954), Nebraska State Senator
- Tony Garrett (1918– 2017), British business executive
- Tracy L. Garrett (fl.1970s–2010s), American marine general
- Trent Garrett (born 1984), American actor
- Trevor Garrett (born 1993), New Zealand cricketer

== U ==
- Umi Garrett (born 2000), American pianist

== V ==
- Van G. Garrett, American poet and novelist
- Vivienne Garrett (born c.1952), Australian actress

== W ==
- Wayne Garrett (born 1947), American baseball player
- Wendell Garrett (1929–2012), Americana expert and historian
- Wendy Garrett, American microbiologist
- William Garrett, co-writer of "Please Mr. Postman"
- William Garrett (Alabama politician) (1809–?), Secretary of State of Alabama, 1840–1852
- William Garrett (businessman) (1902–1977), British industrial chemist and businessperson
- William Garrett (cricketer) (1876–1953), English cricketer
- William Garrett (Medal of Honor) (1842–1916), American Civil War soldier
- William A. Garrett (1854–1951), American lawyer and politician in the Virginia Senate
- William B. Garrett III (born 1953), U.S. Army general

== Z ==
- Zach Garrett (born 1995), American recurve archer

== See also ==
- Garratt (surname)
