= George Garrett =

George Garrett may refer to:

- George Garrard (MP) (a.k.a. George Garrett) (1579–c. 1650), English politician
- George Garrett (MP) (died 1648), English alderman and Sheriff of London
- George Garrett (composer) (1834–1897), English organist and composer
- George Garrett (inventor) (1852–1902), English clergyman and inventor
- George A. Garrett (1888–1971), United States diplomat
- George Garrett (activist) (1896–1966), English labour activist and writer
- George Garrett (hurler) (1908–1969), Irish hurler
- George Garrett (poet) (1929–2008), American writer
- George Garrett (cricketer) (born 2000), English cricketer
- George Garrett (broadcaster), Canadian broadcast journalist
- George T. Garrett, United States Army officer

== See also ==
- George Garratt (1882–?), English footballer
