= William Garrett =

William Garrett may refer to:

- William Garrett, co-writer of "Please Mr. Postman"
- Sir William Garrett (died 1571), Lord Mayor of London, 1555–1556
- William Garrett (Alabama politician) (1809–?), Secretary of State of Alabama, 1840–1852
- William Garrett (businessman) (1902–1977), British industrial chemist and businessperson
- William Garrett (cricketer) (1876–1953), English cricketer
- William Garrett (Medal of Honor) (1842–1916), American Civil War soldier
- William A. Garrett (1854–1951), American lawyer and politician in the Virginia Senate
- William B. Garrett III (born 1953), U.S. Army general
- William Davis "Dub" Garrett (1925–1976), American football player
- Billy Garrett (1933–1999), American racecar driver
- Billy Garrett Jr. (born 1994) American basketball player and grandson of Bill Garrett
- Bill Garrett (basketball) (1929–1974), first African American basketball player in the Big Ten athletic conference
- Bill Garrett (golfer) (1940–2010), American professional golfer
- Ted Garrett (William Edward Garrett, 1920–1993), British Labour Party politician
- William Garrett Lewis (1821–1885), British Baptist preacher
- W. G. Snuffy Walden (William Garrett Walden, born 1950), musician
