= Richard Garrett =

Richard Garrett may refer to:

- Richard Garrett (author) (born 1920), English author, prisoner of war
- Richard Garrett (1755–1839), agricultural machinery manufacturer, founder of Richard Garrett & Sons, Leiston, Suffolk
- Richard Garrett (1779–1837), his son
- Richard Garrett (1807–1866), his son, steam engine manufacturer
- Dickie Garrett (1865–1908), Wales international rugby player
- Richard Garrett (1806–1878), owned the property on which the presidential assassin, John Wilkes Booth was cornered and killed

== See also ==
- Dick Garrett, American basketball player
- Garrett Richards (born 1988), American baseball pitcher
