= James Garrett =

James Garrett may refer to:

- James P. Garrett (1922–2015), Oklahoma state court judge
- James Ramsey Garrett (1817–1855), Irish ornithologist
- James Rube Garrett Jr. (1922–2011), U.S. Marine and author of A Marine Diary
- James Leo Garrett Jr. (1925–2020), American professor of theology
- Jesse James Garrett, experience designer, known for having coined the term Ajax
- Jim Garrett (1930–2018), American football player, coach, and scout
- James Garrett (Zoey 101), character on the TV series Zoey 101
- Jim Garrett (long jumper) (born 1943), American long jumper, 1965 indoor NCAA runner-up for the Michigan State Spartans track and field team
- James Garrett, actor known for voicing Avatar Roku and Alfred Pennyworth
