= John Ward (prophet) =

John Ward (25 December 1781 – 12 March 1837), known as Zion Ward, was an Irish preacher, mystic and self-styled prophet, active (in the latter capacity) in England from around 1828 to 1835. He was one of those claiming to be the successor of prophetess Joanna Southcott after her death. His imprisonment for blasphemy prompted the intervention of member of parliament Joseph Hume.

== Early life and career ==
Ward was born at the Cove of Cork (now Cobh), in County Cork, Ireland, on 25 December 1781. In July 1790, his parents took him to Bristol, England, where, at twelve years of age, he was apprenticed to a shipwright. His father took him to London in 1797, where he learned shoemaking from his brother, but soon went back to his former trade and served on board the man-of-war Blanche as a shipwright; in this capacity he saw action at the Battle of Copenhagen on 2 April 1801.

In 1803, Ward was paid off from the Navy at Sheerness, Kent. He married and returned to the trade of shoemaker. Ward had been brought up a Calvinist, but became a Methodist at his wife's insistence, after moving to Carmarthen in Wales. Unable to experience conversion, he returned to London, resolving to "never more have anything to do with religion". However, after hearing dissenter Jeremiah Learnoult Garrett preach at Lant Street Chapel in Southwark, he joined the Baptists. On Garrett's death in 1806, he aligned himself with the independents, and in 1813, joined the Sandemanians, becoming a village preacher.

== Preacher ==
Just after the death of prophetess Joanna Southcott in 1814, Ward came across her Fifth Book of Wonders. Its universalism captivated him, and he began to preach it. This led to him rejoining the Methodists, who made him a local preacher, but soon dismissed him for his heretical views. The Southcottians would not receive him either.

Convinced by the example of Joanna Southcott that prophecy was "a living gift", Ward looked for another prophet to guide him, falling in with Mary Boon of Staverton, Devon. Boon was a Seventh-day Sabbatarian fanatic who claimed to be Joanna Southcott reborn. Ward became the "reader" of the letters she dictated (for she could neither read nor write), for the benefit of her London followers. Around 1825, Ward began to experience visions in which he was supposedly visited by Southcott in spirit form. His followers reckoned their years from this point, designating 1826 First year, new date.

== Prophet ==
In 1827, Ward gave up shoemaking to proclaim his divine call; his wife and family were convinced that he was mad, and he was reported to the parish officers. He was brought before a Southwark magistrate (Chambers), declared insane, and committed to Newington Workhouse for six months. He continued to experience visions, claiming to have received instruction and a sense of "call and mission". Upon being freed, on 20 November 1828, he claimed to be "a new man, having a new name", Zion. He also called himself Shiloh, as he was convinced that he was the biblical messiah of that name, to whom Southcott had claimed she would give birth.

In 1829, with the help of a follower, Charles William Twort (d. 1878, aged 93), he began to print tracts. He visited and preached in various towns and cities in England, making converts in Nottingham, Chesterfield, Worksop, Blyth, Barnsley, Birmingham, and Sheffield. In 1831, he preached regularly at Borough Chapel in Southwark (London), and in September, attracted notice for two discourses at the Rotunda on Blackfriars Road, previously made notorious by the preaching of Robert Taylor (1784–1844).

== Imprisonment and final years ==
In 1832, Ward and Twort came into conflict with the authorities at Derby. They had posted placards announcing an address on a religious fast day, 15 July. These were torn down three times by a local clergyman, James Dean (d. 1882), whom Twort assaulted. Ward and Twort were subsequently indicted for blasphemy and assault. Tried on 4 August before Sir James Alan Park, Twort was convicted of the assault, and both were found guilty of blasphemy, and sentenced to 18 months' imprisonment in Derby Gaol. The case had already become something of a cause célèbre, attracting the attention of the radical Richard Carlile, amongst others. On 15 August, Henry Hunt, another political radical and agitator, presented a petition to the House of Commons from 200 citizens of London, expressing "disgust and indignation" at the sentence, and praying for the release of Ward and Twort. Hunt made a violent attack on the government for prosecuting opinions; member of parliament Joseph Hume spoke in favour of the petition, and the Attorney General opposed. On Hunt's motion, the house was counted out while Alexander Perceval was speaking. No mitigation of the sentence was obtained, but the confinement, as Ward described it, was by no means harsh.

Freed on 3 February 1834, Ward travelled to Bristol and preached to a congregation there. At the end of 1835 he had a paralytic stroke. In October 1836, he settled in Leeds. He died at 91 Park Lane, Leeds, on 12 March 1837.

== Personality and influences ==
Though said to be of "gentle disposition" and "modest demeanour", Ward was a persuasive speaker, and in conversation and writing, was able to argue with some authority and even humour. His attempts at verse are uncouth, but often effective. His main influence was Joanna Southcott and her school, but he was also familiar with the ideas of George Fox (1624–1691) and Lodowicke Muggleton (1609–1698); however, most of his teaching came from his own considerations on the Bible. He regarded biblical scripture as allegorical, and elaborated a key for eliciting its hidden meanings. His theology is a spiritual pantheism, which allows immortality only to the regenerate.

== Printed works ==
Ward's printed works include over thirty pieces, among which are:

- Vision of Judgment (1829, 2 parts)
- Living Oracle (1830)
- Book of Letters (1831)
- Discourses at the Rotunda (1831)
- Review of Trial and Sentence (1832)
- Creed (1832)
- Spiritual Alphabet (1833)
- Origin of Evil (1837)
- New Light on the Bible (1873)

In 1874, a "jubilee" edition of his works was planned, with the title Writings of Zion Ward, or Shiloh, the Spiritual Man, but only three parts were actually published (Birmingham, 1874–5). However, some additional tracts were printed separately, e.g. Good and Evil made One (1877).

== Bibliography ==
- Zion Ward's answer to Mr. Howitt's History of priestcraft (1863).
- Ward, John & Holinsworth, C. Zions̓ Works: New Light on the Bible, from the Coming of Shiloh, the Spirit of Truth, 1828-1837 (J. Macqueen, 1900):
  - Volume 2
  - Volume 3
  - Volume 4
  - Volume 5
  - Volume 6
  - Volume 7
  - Volume 9
  - Volume 10
  - Volume 11
  - Volume 12
  - Volume 13
  - Volume 14
  - Volume 15
  - Volume 16.
- Balleine, G. R. Past finding out: the tragic story of Joanna Southcott and her successors (S. P. C. K., 1956).
- Harrison, J.F.C. (1979). The Second Coming: Popular Millenarianism, 1780-1850. Routledge & Kegan Paul. pp. 152ff. ISBN 978-0-7100-0191-7. Republished as Harrison, J. F. C. (2013). The Second Coming: Popular Millenarianism, 1780-1850. Routledge Revivals. Taylor & Francis. ISBN 978-1-136-29876-9.
- Zemka, Sue (1997). "Introduction". Victorian testaments: The Bible, christology, and literary authority in early-nineteenth-century British culture. Stanford University Press. ISBN 978-0-8047-2848-5.
