= Leiston =

Town in Suffolk, England

Coordinates: 52.206°N 1.579°E

- Town
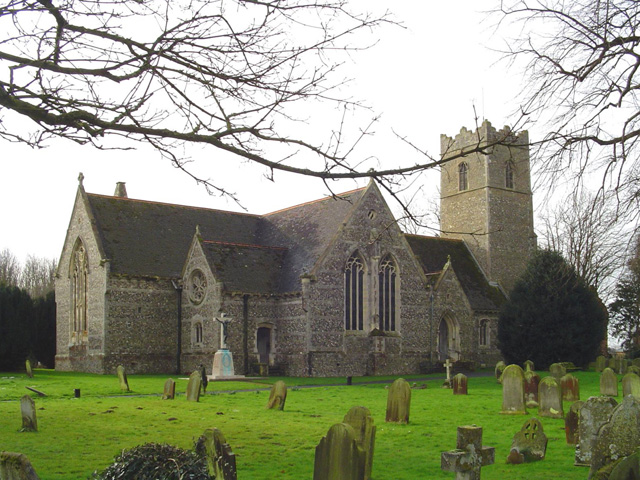
- St Margaret’s Church

- Location within Suffolk
- Population: 5,508 (2011 Census)
- OS grid reference: TM445623
- Civil parish: Leiston
- District: East Suffolk
- Shire county: Suffolk
- Region: East
- Country: England
- Sovereign state: United Kingdom
- Post town: LEISTON
- Postcode district: IP16
- Dialling code: 01728
- Police: Suffolk
- Fire: Suffolk
- Ambulance: East of England
- UK Parliament: Suffolk Coastal

Leiston (/ˈleɪstən/ LAY-stən) is a town and civil parish in the East Suffolk district of Suffolk, England. It is close to Saxmundham and Aldeburgh, 21 miles (34 km) north-east of Ipswich and 90 miles (145 km) north-east of London. The town had a population of 5,508 at the 2011 Census.

== History ==
The name Leiston derives from either the Old English legstūn meaning 'settlement near a beacon fire' or from the Old Norse personal name Leif and tūn meaning 'Leif's settlement'.

The 14th-century remains of Leiston Abbey lie north-west of the town.

Leiston thrived in the late 19th and early 20th centuries as a manufacturing town, dominated by Richard Garrett & Sons, owners of Leiston Works, which boasted the world's first flow assembly line, for the manufacture of portable steam engines. The firm also made steam tractors and a huge variety of cast and machined metal products, including munitions during both world wars. The works closed in 1981 and the site was reused as a mixture of housing, flats and industrial sites. The Long Shop Museum, showing the history, vehicles and products of the works, remains as a heritage tourist attraction.

In 1927, A. S. Neill relocated Summerhill School from Lyme Regis to Leiston. This was the first major "free school" – referring to freedom in education. Children are not required to attend classes and discipline is meted by pupil self-government meetings. Summerhill has inspired a large "free school" movement and more recently, democratic schools in several countries. The school occupies the former mansion of Richard Garrett, owner of Leiston Works.

In the Second World War, RAF Leiston, 1 mile (1.6 km) north-west of the town in the neighbouring village of Theberton, sent fighter squadrons of the American 357th Fighter Group to fight the Luftwaffe. Famous American test pilot and fighter ace General Chuck Yeager (later, first to break the sound barrier) flew out of RAF Leiston. The Friends of Leiston Airfield hold a memorial service and flying display at the end of May each year, with veterans and their families attending.

=== Leiston Communist Party ===
The Leiston Communist Party was a branch of the Communist Party of Great Britain founded in 1933, and included members such as Paxton Chadwick and A. L. Morton.

One of their first actions took place in February 1934 when they organised for the Norwich to London Hunger March. They also took part in the Burston Strike School.

From 1935 the Leiston Communist Party organised a Popular front where they managed to defeat the well entrenched Conservative majority on the local council. This unity continued for many years, and together they produced their own radical publication the ‘Leiston Leader’ with a circulation of 300–500 copies, and raising aid together for a variety of causes, but most importantly for the Spanish Civil War. Due to its popularity in the area Leiston was nicknamed "Little Moscow".

== Governance ==
There is an electoral ward named Leiston, with a population at the 2011 census of 6,360.

In 1895 Leiston became an urban district under the name Leiston cum Sizewell which became part of the administrative county of East Suffolk in 1889, the district contained the parish of Leiston. On 1 April 1974 the district was abolished and became part of Suffolk Coastal in the non-metropolitan county of Suffolk. A successor parish was formed named "Leiston" covering the same area as the former district and its parish. In 2019 Leiston became part of East Suffolk district.

== Economy and community ==
=== Business ===
Since the closure of Garrett's, the town's economy has been dominated by two nuclear power stations on the coast at Sizewell: the now decommissioned Magnox reactors of Sizewell A, and the more modern 1,200 MW Pressurised Water Reactor of Sizewell B. The 850 MW Greater Gabbard and Galloper offshore wind farms connect to the Leiston substation adjacent to the Sizewell nuclear power station; all supplying power to the 400kV National Grid.

A number of smaller companies operate from industrial areas within the town.

Leiston's High Street serves as the business and market hub of the surrounding agricultural district. The town's facilities include a post office, library, pubs and a range of shops and other services.

=== Transport ===
A railway branch spur from the Great Eastern line, known as the Aldeburgh branch line, went from Saxmundham to Aldeburgh, with intermediate stations at Leiston and Thorpeness. On 12 September 1966 British Rail withdrew all passenger services to Leiston and beyond. However, the line to Leiston remains active for the purpose of servicing Sizewell B power station, decommissioning Sizewell A and facilitating the construction of Sizewell C via a temporary branch to the north of Leiston.

Leiston has direct bus services to Ipswich, Saxmundham, Aldeburgh, Thorpeness and Halesworth.

=== Culture ===
Leiston Film Theatre, a half-timbered building with street front shops, is the oldest purpose-built cinema in Suffolk. The cinema is owned and run by Leiston-cum-Sizewell Town Council and backed by Leiston Film Theatre Support Club, which has raised money for stage refurbishment and enabled the cinema to install a digital 3D projection system.

The town has a traditional Anglican church, St Margaret's, with an ancient tower and an unusual 19th-century nave. Leiston United Church has a community garden. There are Roman Catholic and Baptist churches on the edge of the town.

=== Sport and leisure ===
The town's football club is Leiston F.C., who as of the 2023–24 season play in the Southern League Premier Central. In November 2008 the team reached the first round of the FA Cup for the first time in its history, drawing 0–0 with Fleetwood Town before losing the replay 2–0.

Leiston also has a leisure centre, a skate park and several parks.

Leiston and Thorpeness Rugby Club was in existence in the late 1980s and early 1990s. It closed in 1995, but was revived in March 2010 as Aldeburgh and Thorpeness Rugby Club, with many of the previous club's members.

=== Media ===
Local news and television programmes are provided by BBC East and ITV Anglia. Television signals are received from the Tacolneston TV transmitter and via a local relay transmitter in Aldeburgh.

Local radio stations are BBC Radio Suffolk, Heart East, Greatest Hits Radio Ipswich & Suffolk, and Alde and Blyth Community Radio (ABC), a community based station.

The town's local newspaper is the East Anglian Daily Times.

=== Education ===
Other than Summerhill School, Leiston also has conventional primary and secondary schools.

Leiston Primary School caters for pupils aged 5–11 and runs a nursery with 52 places.

Alde Valley Academy is a secondary school with academy status, formerly known as Leiston Community High School, then as Alde Valley School from September 2012, after reorganisation involving the closure of Leiston Middle School and conversion from a 13–18 school to one taking pupils from the age of 11. The school received academy status in January 2015 and was renamed Alde Valley Academy.

In 2001 the school had become a Specialist Technology College, and in following years was named as one of the most improved schools in England. It was the lead school in the Schools Energy Network based at the Orbis Centre in Lowestoft and had strong links with the Sizewell nuclear power stations.

== Notable people ==
In birth order:

- Ranulf de Glanvill (died 1190), Chief Justiciar of England, founded Leiston Abbey for White Canons in 1183.
- Richard Garrett (1755–1839) founded the engineering company Richard Garrett and Sons in Leiston.
- Edward Buckton Lamb (1806–1869), architect, designed St Margaret's Church in Leiston.
- Newson Garrett (1812–1893), born in Leiston, built up the malting business whose premises were converted into the Snape Maltings concert hall.
- A. S. Neill (1883–1973), Scottish educationalist, founded the progressive Summerhill School in 1924 and moved it to Leiston in 1927.
- M. E. Aldrich Rope (1891–1988), born and died in Leiston, was a stained-glass artist in the Arts and Crafts tradition.
- Paxton Chadwick (1903–1961), artist and illustrator, taught at Summerhill and was Communist chair of Leiston Town Council.
- Steve Brennan (born 1951), darts player
- Ryan Meikle (born 1996), darts player
