= Paxton Chadwick =

Albert Chadwick is an English Artist and a Politician

Albert Paxton Chadwick (4 September 1903 - 6 September 1961) was an English artist, art teacher and politician.

Paxton was born at Fallowfield, Manchester, the son of George Harry Chadwick, and Helen Wrigley née Renton. Paxton attended Manchester Grammar School followed by Manchester School of Art. He then started out on a career as a commercial artist, first in Manchester, then London followed by Welwyn Garden City, Hertfordshire. However A. S. Neill offered him a job as art teacher at Summerhill School, which Chadwick accepted. Here he soon fitted in with a group of Communist Party activists. When the Leiston Communist Party was founded in 1934, Chadwick became a member by 1935.

Chad, as he was known, became a prominent local councillor and secretary of the Leiston Communist Party. He raised safety concerns when the Central Electricity Generating Board started to consider building a power station at Sizewell.

== Bibliography ==
- Wild Animals in Britain (Puffin Picture Book No 105), Penguin Books, 1958. [wrote and illustrated].
- Pond Life (Puffin Picture Book No 93), written by Jean Gorvett. Penguin Books, 1952. [Chadwick illustrated].
- Life Histories (Puffin Picture Book No 116), Penguin Collectors' Society, 1995. [wrote and illustrated, unpublished at his death and later published by the Penguin Collectors' Society].
