= Alde Valley Academy =

Location
- Seaward Avenue; Leiston, Suffolk, IP16 4BG; England; 52.2032°N 1.5855°E

Information
- Type: Academy
- Motto: 'Achievement for All'
- Local authority: Suffolk
- Department for Education URN: 141236 Tables
- Ofsted: Reports
- Headteacher: L Hernandez
- Deputy Headteacher: S Smith
- Gender: Co-educational
- Age: 11 to 16
- Enrolment: c.500
- Capacity: 500
- Houses: Alde, Blyth, Deben, Orwell, Waveney
- Colours: Navy blue & sky blue
- Publication: Alde Valley Academy Newsletter
- Website: www.aldevalley.suffolk.sch.uk

Alde Valley Academy is a secondary school with academy status in Leiston in the English county of Suffolk. It has approximately 500 pupils aged 11 to 16, and a staff count of approximately 82. It draws pupils from the surrounding coastal area, including the towns of Leiston, Aldeburgh and Saxmundham.

The academy was previously known as Leiston Community High School and was, for many years a 13 to 18 school. In September 2012, as part of reorganisation of high school education in Suffolk, the school became an 11 to 18 school and rebranded itself as Alde Valley School, a name chosen to reflect its large and rural catchment area. On 1 January 2015, Alde Valley School converted to an academy sponsored by the Bright Tribe Trust. The school is now known as Alde Valley Academy. In 2019 the school joined Waveney Valley Academies Trust.

The academy's ethos is underpinned the motto 'aspire and achieve, lead with kindness, stronger together'. The Headteacher is Ms L Hernandez and the Deputy Headteacher is Mr S Smith.

The academy was awarded a 'requires improvement' rating in 2024.
