= Snape Maltings Concert Hall =

Arts complex in Suffolk, England

Coordinates: 52.163442°N 1.496358°E

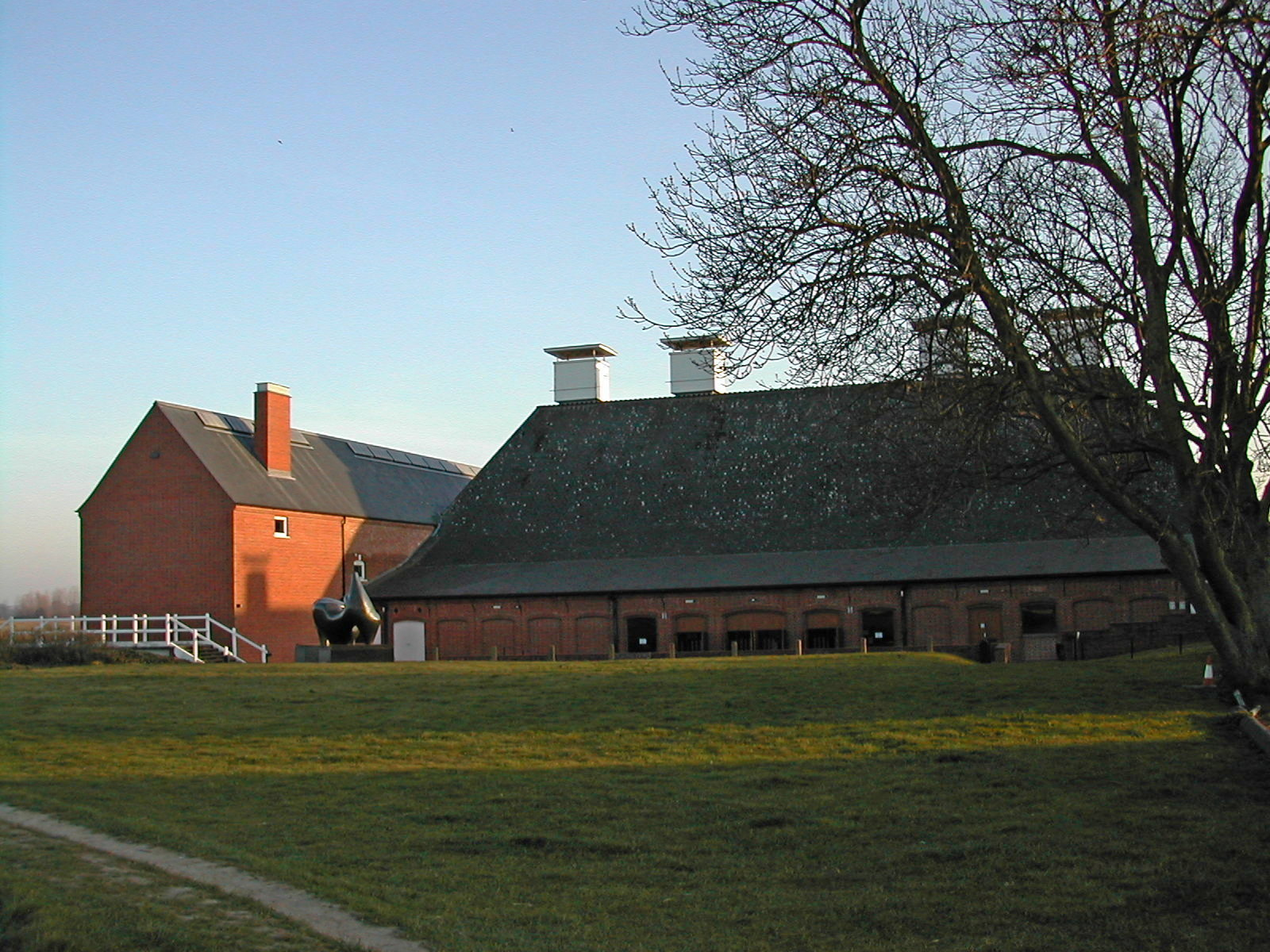
Snape Maltings concert hall

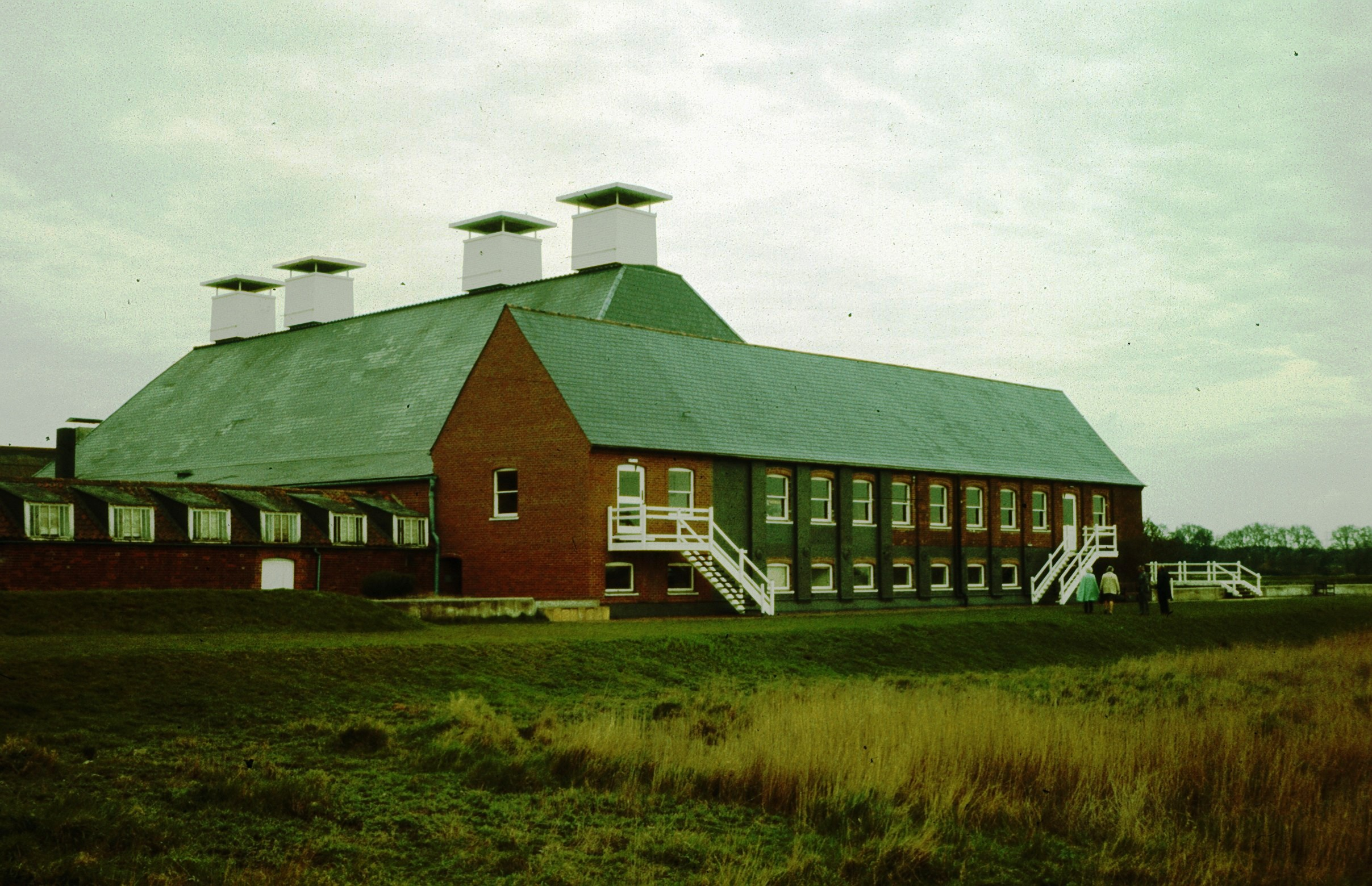
Snape Maltings concert hall in 1975

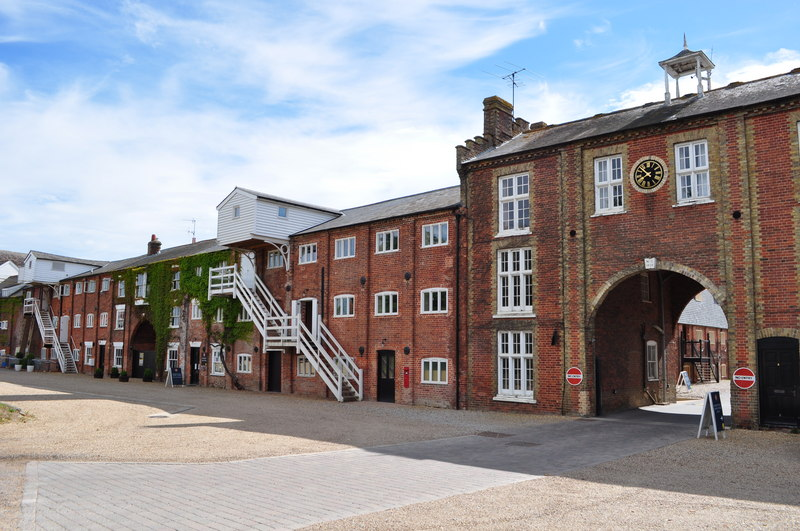
The front of the complex July 2010

Snape Maltings Concert Hall is an arts complex on the banks of the River Alde at Snape, Suffolk, England. It is best known as one of the main sites of the annual Aldeburgh Festival. It is now one of two headquarters for Britten Pears Arts, with the other being The Red House.

The original purpose of the Maltings was the malting of barley for the brewing of beer; local barley, once malted, was sent from here to London and exported to mainland Europe. Today a collection of shops, galleries, restaurants and the Concert Hall fill the old buildings. The Alde estuary is known for wildlife and river trips.

== History ==
The complex of malting buildings was begun in 1846 and extended in the later 19th century. Newson Garrett, a Victorian entrepreneur, built the Maltings in the 1800s; his name appears on plaques around the site. The river made Garrett decide to build a maltings at this already busy port. Newson was ambitious and determined and in 1841 purchased the business of Osborne and Fennell, corn and coal merchants of Snape Bridge. From this port the Maltings began to evolve, using the River Alde to transport barley across Britain and into Europe on Thames barges. Within three years of his arrival, Newson Garrett was shipping 17,000 quarters of barley a year from Snape. Much of this barley would have been destined for breweries, where it had first to be malted. Newson saw an opportunity. Snape was in the heart of good agricultural land, and halfway between the brewing area of Norwich and London. Demand from the London breweries was growing fast, and it was becoming impractical to make malt and brew beer on the same premises. In 1854 he began malting at Snape, and was soon shipping malt, rather than barley, to the breweries.

The Maltings process at Snape came to an end in the 1960s as Swonnell and Son went into liquidation and seven acres of industrial buildings were left vacant. Thirty acres of land was offered for sale, including dwellings and an inn. It was difficult to imagine how such functional structures could be put to different use. However, local farmer and businessman George Gooderham, recognising the potential, purchased the site and set about finding alternative uses for the buildings.

By the 1960s the Aldeburgh Music Festival was outgrowing the limited space available in the Jubilee Hall. Benjamin Britten started to look around for somewhere to build a concert hall. Britten had the vision to see the largest Malthouse, in its magnificent setting overlooking the saltings, as a possible site. Negotiations with George Gooderham began and after little more than a year Snape Maltings Concert Hall was ready to be opened by the Queen at the start of the 1967 Aldeburgh Festival.

In 2015, the maltings was sold for an undisclosed sum to Aldeburgh Music, who had been renting some of the buildings. Snape Maltings is now a registered charity.

== Benjamin Britten ==
The composer Benjamin Britten was inspired by the vast skies and moody seas of the Suffolk coast, and in 1948, along with singer Peter Pears and writer Eric Crozier, he founded the Aldeburgh Festival. Britten and Pears made a point of educating and supporting young artists. They brought together international stars and emerging talent, including world-renowned figures such as Dietrich Fischer-Dieskau, Yehudi Menuhin, Sviatoslav Richter and Mstislav Rostropovich, and young stars in the making such as Elisabeth Söderström, Murray Perahia and Julian Bream.

== Venues ==
At first the Festival used local halls and churches but in 1967, Britten and Pears created a permanent home at Snape, 5 miles from Aldeburgh, by converting the Victorian maltings into an 832-seat venue. Within five years Britten and Pears had reclaimed more buildings on the site to establish a centre for talented young musicians.

In 2006 Aldeburgh Music purchased a 999-year lease of the Snape Maltings Concert Hall, investing around £14 million in new studios and rehearsal spaces which came into use in 2009. The "Creative Campus" at Snape Maltings has four performance venues (from 70 to 830 capacity) and over 20 rehearsal and public spaces. Aldeburgh Music purchased the full property in 2015.

=== Snape Maltings Concert Hall ===
Snape Maltings Concert Hall, Concert Hall Gallery, Oyster Bar and Restaurant

Built by Newson Garrett in the mid-19th century, the 832-seat Concert Hall began life as a malthouse. The conversion of the building was undertaken by Arup Associates, with the acoustics supervised by Derek Sugden. Work started on site in 1966. Officially opened in 1967 by Queen Elizabeth II, the Hall suffered serious fire damage two years later, re-opening in time for the Aldeburgh Festival the following year.

=== Hoffmann Building ===
Britten Studio, Jerwood Kiln Studio, rehearsal rooms. Opened in May 2009, the Hoffmann Building features two spaces suitable for performances as well as a number of additional rehearsal rooms, office space and a social area. The centrepiece of the building is the new Britten Studio, designed to have an excellent and flexible acoustic with a high level of sound insulation for recording. Ideal for orchestral rehearsals, it can also be used as a 340-seat venue.

The Jerwood Kiln Studio, which seats up to 80 people in a flexible configuration, is an ideal space for smaller groups to rehearse, and is equipped for video and electro-acoustic installations. The Studio retains the double-height roof and much of the existing fabric of the original kiln structure.

=== Britten–Pears Building ===
Peter Pears Recital Room, Holst Library, rehearsal rooms. A former barley store, the Britten–Pears Building was officially opened in 1979 by Queen Elizabeth The Queen Mother.

=== Holst Library ===
The Holst Library is connected to the Maltings. Many of the original contents were donated by Imogen Holst, who was a close friend of Benjamin Britten and an artistic director of the Aldeburgh Festival from 1956 to 1977, and it was named the Gustav Holst Library as a memorial to her father. According to her press release for the Aldeburgh Festival Office, "the Gustav Holst Library will be a working library for the use of the students. It is being called after him in gratitude for his music and his teaching."

The library was officially opened by Queen Elizabeth the Queen Mother and is open by appointment. It is situated in two rooms on the second floor of the BPP buildings in the Snape Maltings complex. The collection comprises books, scores and audio materials (LP, tape and CD) covering many genres. Much of the Library's stock is available for searching on the web catalogue of the Britten-Pears Library.
