= Newington Workhouse =

Workhouse in Walworth, London, England

Coordinates: 51°29′8″N 0°5′3″W

Newington Workhouse was an institution for indoor relief of the poor at 182 Westmoreland Road, (now Beaconsfield Road), Walworth, London, in what is now the London Borough of Southwark. It became the Newington Lodge Public Assistance Institution in 1930, and was converted into social housing in 1948. The building was demolished in 1969.

== History ==
The workhouse was built in 1850 in the hamlet of Walworth to replace an older workhouse belonging to the parish of St Mary Newington first opened in 1734. The 1850 building was originally intended to be an industrial school. The site was taken over in 1868 by the St Saviour Poor Law Union and became an infirmary.

The Local Government Act 1929 abolished the workhouse system, and in 1930 Newington Workhouse became the Newington Lodge Public Assistance Institution, until the Poor Laws were repealed in 1948. It then continued to be used as social housing by London County Council Welfare Department. In 1961 it held "266 women and children from 72 fragmented families". The building was demolished in 1969 and replaced by the Aylesbury Estate.

The records of the institution are now held in the London Metropolitan Archives.

== Cultural significance ==
The comic actor Charlie Chaplin spent a short time in Newington Workhouse in 1896.

The 1966 television play Cathy Come Home depicted the living conditions in Newington Lodge.
