= Howard F. Garrett =

American politician (1918–1994)

Member of the Missouri House of Representatives
- In office 1962–1982

Personal details
- Born: June 16, 1918 Albany, Alabama
- Died: January 20, 1994 (aged 75) near Festus, Missouri
- Party: Democratic
- Spouse(s): Bessie C. Morris (1939); Margaret Kraenzle (1970)
- Children: 3 (2 sons, 1 daughter)
- Occupation: tire salesman

Howard F. Garrett (June 16, 1918 – January 20, 1994) was an American politician who served in the Missouri House of Representatives. He was first elected to the Missouri House of Representatives in 1962. He succeeded his father J. Ben Garrett (1886–1976) who served 10 years in the Missouri House of Representatives. Garrett served in the U.S. Army during the World War II European Theater between 1944 and 1946. He was awarded the Bronze Star during the war. Garrett married his first wife, Bessie C. Morris, in 1939. They had three children. He later married Margaret Kraenzle in 1970.
