= Richard Garrett (1755–1839) =

Founder of farm machinery firm

Richard Garrett (12 October 1755 – 20 October 1839) founded Richard Garrett & Sons, the agricultural machinery manufacturing plant in Leiston in the English county of Suffolk. The company was the largest employer in Leiston in the 19th century. Part of the building is preserved as the Long Shop Museum.

== Family and career ==
Born the first of twelve children in Melton, Suffolk, Garrett married Elizabeth Newson on 1 October 1778. They had six sons and three daughters. When Elizabeth died in 1794, Garrett married Jemima Cottingham. Elizabeth came from Leiston and the couple settled there on their marriage. He became a bladesmith and gunsmith at a High Street forge rented from William Cracey.

Garrett was soon employing eight men and by 1830 the works had 60 employees. His son Richard, the third to bear the name, succeeded him as works manager in 1826. The fourth Richard transformed it into a nationally significant manufacturer of steam engines and traction engines.

== Descendants ==
Garrett's grandson Newson Garrett, founder of Snape Maltings, was the father of several remarkable women: Agnes Garrett, the first woman to set up an interior design company, Elizabeth Garrett Anderson, Britain's first female doctor, and Millicent Garrett Fawcett, a prominent suffragist. Another descendant was the mycologist Denis Garrett.
