= Leah Garrett =

American researcher and writer

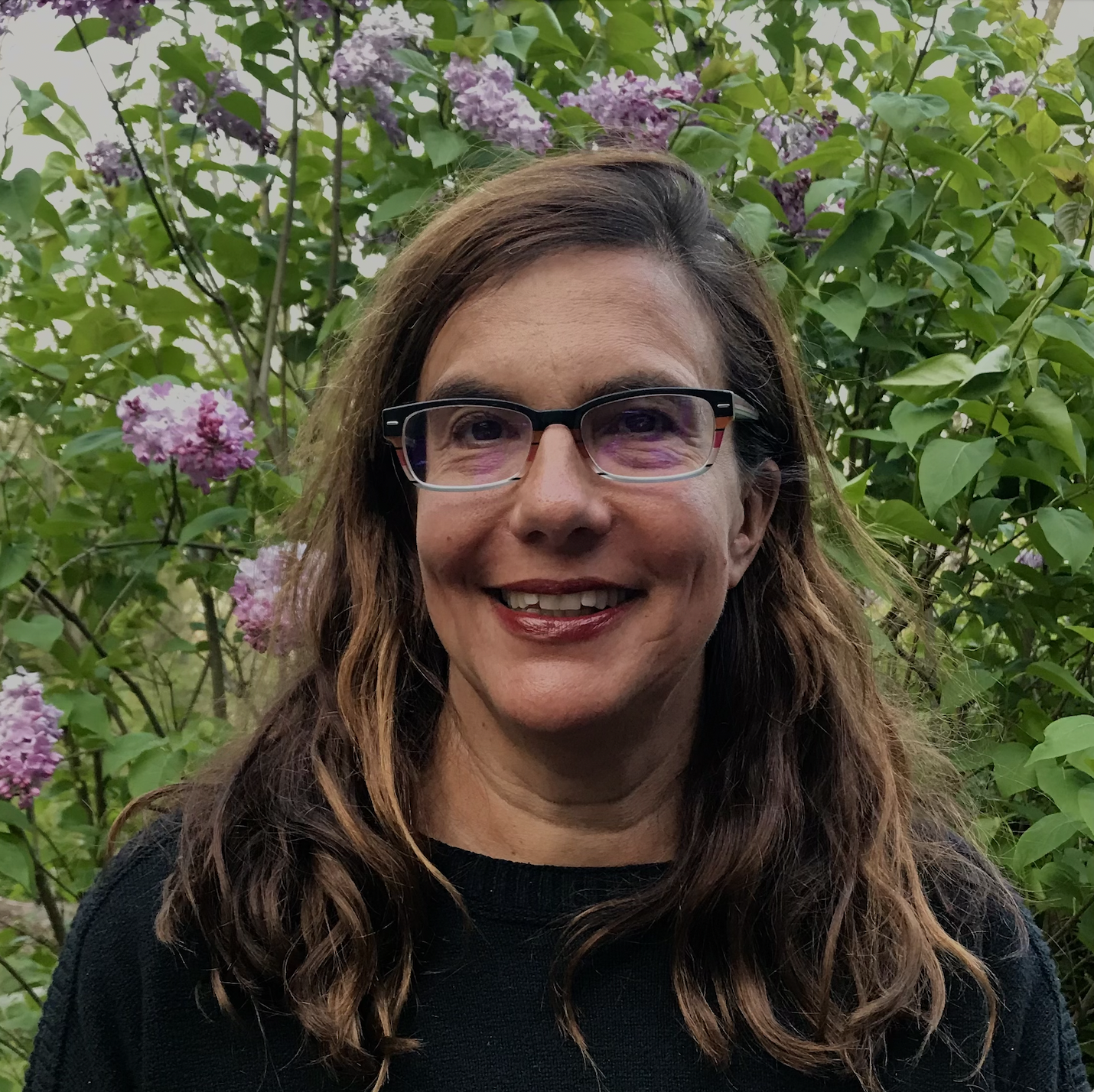
- Born: New York City
- Citizenship: American
- Education: Marylhurst University, University of Oxford, The Jewish Theological Seminary of America
- Known for: X Troop
- Scientific career
- Fields: Jewish Studies; Hebrew Studies, Yiddish Studies, World War II
- Workplaces: Hunter College, Monash University, University of Denver, University of Warwick, The Jewish Theological Seminary of America
- Thesis: (1999)

Leah Garrett is an American professor and "Larry and Klara Silverstein Chair in Jewish studies" and Director of Hebrew and Jewish Studies, at Hunter College, City University of New York.

== Academic biography ==
Garrett graduated with honors from Maryhurst University in the state of Oregon in 1991. The following year she completed a Diploma in Jewish Studies at the University of Oxford, England. Garrett completed her PhD with Honors in 1999 at the Jewish Theological Seminary of America in New York City, during which she was also a Fulbright fellow at Tel Aviv University. In the same year, she was appointed as an assistant professor at the Center for Jewish Studies at the University of Denver, Colorado, and served there in this position until 2008. In the same year, she took up a post at Monash University, Melbourne Australia as a research professor for Contemporary Jewish culture. In 2013 Garrett was appointed as the Deputy Head of the Australian Center for Jewish Civilization at Monash University. During this time she served as honorary professor of history at the University of Warwick, England. Since 2018 she has been the Director of the Center for Jewish Studies at Hunter College.

== Publications ==
Garrett has published more than twenty peer reviewed articles and other publications. The most prominent are her four sole-authored books:

- Journeys beyond the Pale: Yiddish Travel Writing in the Modern World (University of Wisconsin Press: 2003) examines how Yiddish and Hebrew writers, from Mendele Mocher Sforim to Sholem Aleichem, used travel motifs to express their complicated relationship with modernization.
- A Knight at the Opera: Heine, Wagner, Herzl, Peretz, and the Legacy of Der Tannhäuser-Shofar Supplements in Jewish Studies (Purdue University Press: 2011). In this book Garrett examines the role played by the medieval legend and the Wagner Tannhäuser opera in Jewish cultural life in the nineteenth and early twentieth centurys.
- Young Lions: How Jewish Authors reinvented the American War novel (Northwestern University Press: 2017). In this book, Garrett shows how Jewish authors used the theme of World War II to reshape the ideas of the American public about the war, the Holocaust and the role of the Jews in post-war life. This book won the Jordan Schnitzer Award for Modern Jewish History.
- X Troop: The Secret Jewish Commandos of World War II (Harper Collins US, Chatto Penguin Books UK: 2021) brought Garrett the most publicity in the United States, England, Europe and Israel. The book received praise and coverage in newspapers such as: The Washington Post, "the New york journal of books", "The Telegraph", the "Kirkus Reviews", "Publishers Weekly", and more.The Wall Street Journal crowned it as "the book of the month". The book was featured on CSPAN, Time, and CNN. The National World War II Museum hosted Garrett in June 2021 for a webinar on that book.
- The Flight Nurses’ War: The American Women Who Saved Thousands of Lives at Iwo Jima and Okinawa - Hardcover – 13 (to be published October 2026 with Basic Books US/Atlantic Books UK.). The unsung story of heroic World War II combat nurses sent into the battles of Iwo Jima and Okinawa to save thousands of American soldiers and Marines (Seal Press). In The Flight Nurses’ War, award-winning historian Leah Garrett traces the lives of eight nurses from their small-town origins to the devastation of Iwo Jima and Okinawa. They risked their lives on rickety, unpressurized aircraft and braved constant enemy assaults. As the battles intensified, Army nurses were also deployed to hospital ships and the infantry front- line, where they endured disease, snipers, and Kamikazes. Successfully evacuating thousands of wounded men from danger, the combat nurses freed up troops to secure both islands and help win the war.

Garrett also was the sole editor of The Cross and Other Jewish Stories: New Yiddish Library Series by Lamed Shapiro (Yale University Press: 2007).
