= Marvin Garrett =

American bareback rider

- Born: July 28, 1963 (age 62); Belle Fourche, South Dakota, U.S.
- Occupation: Bareback rider
- Relatives: Mark Garrett (brother)

Marvin Garrett (born July 28, 1963) is an American former professional rodeo cowboy who specialized in bareback bronc riding. He competed in the Professional Rodeo Cowboys Association (PRCA) and won the PRCA bareback riding world championship four times in 1988, 1989, 1994, and 1995.

== Life and career ==
Marvin Garrett was born on July 28, 1963, in Belle Fourche, South Dakota. He told his fourth grade teacher he wanted to be a cowboy when he grew up. To prove it, he began riding steers when he was 12. However, when he was 15, his mother prevented him from being a bull rider, as he was still not old enough to sign his own Association permit. He was, however, allowed to ride in bareback bronc riding. He said that the first time he tried it, he knew that would be his rodeo discipline of choice and ditched the idea of being a bull rider.

Garrett was All-State and All-American wrestling champion during his senior year of high school in 1982. He received wrestling scholarships from Iowa and North Dakota, and Wyoming. Instead, he decided to pursue rodeo.

Garrett joined the PRCA in 1984. That same year, he was the 1984 PRCA bareback riding Rookie of the Year. He would then go on to win the PRCA Mountain States Circuit bareback riding championship in 1987, 1988, and 1990. He was a member of the U.S. rodeo team at the 1988 Winter Olympics in Calgary, Alberta, Canada. He won the PRCA bareback riding world championship at the National Finals Rodeo (NFR) in 1988, 1989, 1994, and 1995. He also won the NFR bareback riding average in 1989 and 1995. He later won the PRCA Badlands Circuit bareback riding championship in 2001. He qualified for the NFR a total of 12 times in his career.

Garrett's younger brother is Mark Garrett, a fellow former bareback rider who won the PRCA bareback riding world championship in 1996.

On November 4 1998, Marvin and Mark Garrett, saddle bronc rider Scott Johnston, and bull rider Thad Bothwell were traveling between rodeos in a single engine Cessna-210 when it crashed into a row of trees and caught on fire in Lodi, California. They were on their way to San Francisco to compete at the Grand National Rodeo, the last regular-season PRCA rodeo before the NFR in December. Mark helped his traveling partners escape the burning plane. Marvin suffered a fractured vertebra and broken right arm, while Johnston suffered serious internal injuries and a broken back. The airplane's pilot, retired rodeo cowboy Johnny Morris suffered a broken back and burns on over 70 percent of his body. The three were hospitalized at UC Davis Medical Center in Sacramento. Mark only suffered some cuts and bruises, while Bothwell suffered a broken back. Both were hospitalized at St. Joseph's Medical Center in Stockton. Morris died from his injuries two weeks after the incident. A leaking fuel pump was later determined to be the cause of the crash.

== Honors ==
In 1998, Marvin Garrett was inducted into the ProRodeo Hall of Fame. His brother Mark would later join him; being inducted in 2015.

In 2017, Marvin was inducted into the South Dakota Sports Hall of Fame.
