= Isaac P. Garrett =

American politician (1844–1923)

Member of the Pennsylvania House of Representatives from the Delaware County district
- In office 1888 – December 1, 1889
- In office 1881–1882

Personal details
- Born: Isaac Price Garrett; August 4, 1844 Stanton, Delaware, U.S.
- Died: February 19, 1923 (aged 78) Lansdowne, Pennsylvania, U.S.
- Resting place: Friends Southwestern Burial Ground; Upper Darby Township, Pennsylvania, U.S.
- Party: Republican
- Spouse: Sarah Emlen Bell (m. 1868)
- Children: 3
- Relatives: William Garrett
- Occupation: Politician; farmer

Isaac Price Garrett (August 4, 1844 – February 19, 1923) was an American politician from Pennsylvania. He served as a member of the Pennsylvania House of Representatives, representing Delaware County from 1881 to 1882 and from 1888 to 1889.

== Early life ==
Isaac Price Garrett was born on August 4, 1844, in Stanton, Delaware, to Mary (née Haines) and Benjamin Garrett. He was named after his uncle. He was descended from William Garrett, a member of the Pennsylvania Colonial Assembly. At the age of five, he moved to Lansdowne, Pennsylvania, to live with his uncle. He attended Westtown Academy.

== Career ==
Garrett served as a member of the board of directors of Upper Darby Township, Pennsylvania, for 23 years. He was president of the board of directors for 15 years. He was delegate to the Delaware County Republican Convention. He was supervisor of Upper Darby Township from 1876 to 1881. He was elected in a special election as a Republican to the Pennsylvania House of Representatives, representing Delaware County on October 27, 1881. He served from 1881 to 1882 and lost the election in 1882. He was elected again and served from 1888 to his resignation on December 1, 1889.

Garrett was a farmer until 1889. He was appointed as cashier of the United States Customs Service in Philadelphia in 1889. He served in that role until 1894. He then worked in insurance in Philadelphia until 1897. He was appointed postmaster of Lansdowne by President William McKinley on July 7, 1897. He was appointed again by President Theodore Roosevelt on January 13, 1902. He continued in the role until 1914 and served in the role again from 1921 to 1923. He was trustee of the Lansdowne Public Library from 1895 to his death, excluding one year.

== Personal life ==
Garrett married Sarah Emlen Bell, daughter of Chalkley Bell, of Bloomington, Illinois, on November 12, 1868. They had three children, Annie Emlen, Charles Taylor and Samuel Emlen.

Garrett died of pneumonia on February 19, 1923, at his 118 North Lansdowne Avenue home in Lansdowne. He was interred at Friends Southwestern Burial Ground in Upper Darby Township.
