= Mark Garrett =

American bareback rider

- Born: August 19, 1965 (age 60); Gettysburg, South Dakota, U.S.
- Occupation: Bareback rider
- Spouse: Jennifer Garrett
- Children: 4
- Relatives: Marvin Garrett (brother)

Mark Garrett (born August 19, 1965) is an American former professional rodeo cowboy who specialized in bareback bronc riding. He competed in the Professional Rodeo Cowboys Association (PRCA) and won the PRCA bareback riding world championship in 1996.

== Life and career ==
Mark Garrett was born in Gettysburg, South Dakota. He is the younger brother of Marvin Garrett, a fellow former bareback rider.

Mark qualified for the National Finals Rodeo (NFR) a total of nine times in his career; 1989-1991, 1994-1997, and 1999-2000. In 1996, he won the PRCA bareback riding world championship, as well as the NFR bareback riding average. Other major titles he won were the PRCA Mountain States Circuit bareback riding championship in 1992 and 1993, the PRCA Badlands Circuit bareback riding championship in 1999 and 2002, and the National Circuit Finals Rodeo all-around championship in 2000. Marvin won the PRCA bareback riding world championship in 1988, 1989, 1994, and 1995.

On November 4 1998, Mark and Marvin Garrett, saddle bronc rider Scott Johnston, and bull rider Thad Bothwell were traveling between rodeos in a single engine Cessna-210 when it crashed into a row of trees and caught on fire in Lodi, California. They were on their way to San Francisco to compete at the Grand National Rodeo, the last regular-season PRCA rodeo before the NFR in December. Mark helped his traveling partners escape the burning plane. Marvin suffered a fractured vertebra and broken right arm, while Johnston suffered serious internal injuries and a broken back. The airplane's pilot, retired rodeo cowboy Johnny Morris suffered a broken back and burns on over 70 percent of his body. The three were hospitalized at UC Davis Medical Center in Sacramento. Bothwell suffered a broken back, while Mark was the least hurt of the group; only suffering some cuts and bruises. Both were hospitalized at St. Joseph's Medical Center in Stockton. Morris died from his injuries two weeks after the incident. A leaking fuel pump was later determined to be the cause of the crash.

In 2015, Mark Garrett was inducted into the ProRodeo Hall of Fame. His brother Marvin was inducted in 1998.
