= Christina Hallowell Garrett =

British historian (1876–1960)

- Born: July 5, 1876; Philadelphia, Pennsylvania, United States
- Died: 1960
- Occupation(s): Historian and academic

Christina Hallowell Garrett (July 5, 1876 – 1960) was an American academic and authority on the Marian exiles, English Protestant exiles during the reign of Mary I of England.

== Selected works ==
- The Marian exiles, (1553-1559). A study in the origins of Elizabethan puritanism, 1938
- The resurreccion of the masse, 1940
- The legatine register of Cardinal Pole, 1554-57, 1941
