= Frank Douglas Garrett =

American scholar and basketball player

Frank Douglas Garrett is an American former basketball player, marine and academic. He is a graduate of Mackenzie High in Detroit.

== Athletic career ==
An all-star Detroit Michigan basketball player selected in 1961 and 1962.

A USMC Basketball All-Star during the years 1964–66;

A JUCO All-American Basketball Selection in 1968.

Captain of the Detroit College Basketball team in 1969–70.

Coaching at the high school and college levels as an assistant and head basketball coach during the 1970s.

== Military service and later life ==
Holding the rank of Sergeant, he served honorably during the Vietnam Era in the United States Marine Corps. He later served as an Oakland UniversityDean and Professor of Education. Honored by Governor Daniels as a Distinguished Hoosier and with a key to the city on the town basketball court by his adopted hometown of Odon Indiana during Old Settlers in August 2006. Author of the force of evil published in 2011.

“The Force of Evil reveals, in written form, the heart of a man who has a deep love for his God and for his country. Dr. Garrett is passionate about both. He is unafraid to speak of the problems facing this country, and he is unashamed to say that understanding God and His principles is the solution to these problems wherever they are found. While carefully challenging views that are non-Christian, he is respectful of all people. He makes a careful distinction between those who simply do not believe and those who have an agenda to destroy the Judeo-Christian values that have been part of this country from the beginning. Dr. Garrett serves as a watchman whose clarion calls should not be ignored.”

Pastor Allen Burris

Mitchell Church of Christ

Mitchell, Indiana.

This book was written to help future generations comprehend how dangerous it is for American culture to lean toward socialism, which is known to kill people and destroy freedom, and toward multiculturalism, at the expense of capitalism and assimilation. By the time my book was released, in 2011, American universities had largely neglected the instruction of patriotism, free speech, and any mention of God—all of which were systematically ridiculed and suppressed. A multi-generational campaign by the terrorist group The Muslim Brotherhood had been launched to transform America from within while conservative Christian speakers encountered censorship by universities throughout the United States. This underscored a troubling trend in which free speech was increasingly stifled on campus, and students were becoming less able and less willing to engage with or contemplate opposing viewpoints. By 2011, students were being brainwashed in high schools and at universities across America to question the concepts of patriotism and the American Dream, and were influenced by a distorted Christian doctrine that endorsed court decisions influenced by ideology rather than law. Socialism, multiculturalism, crime, and illegal immigration were all spreading while completely disregarding social cohesion and the rule of law.
