= Newson Garrett =

English maltster (1812–1893)

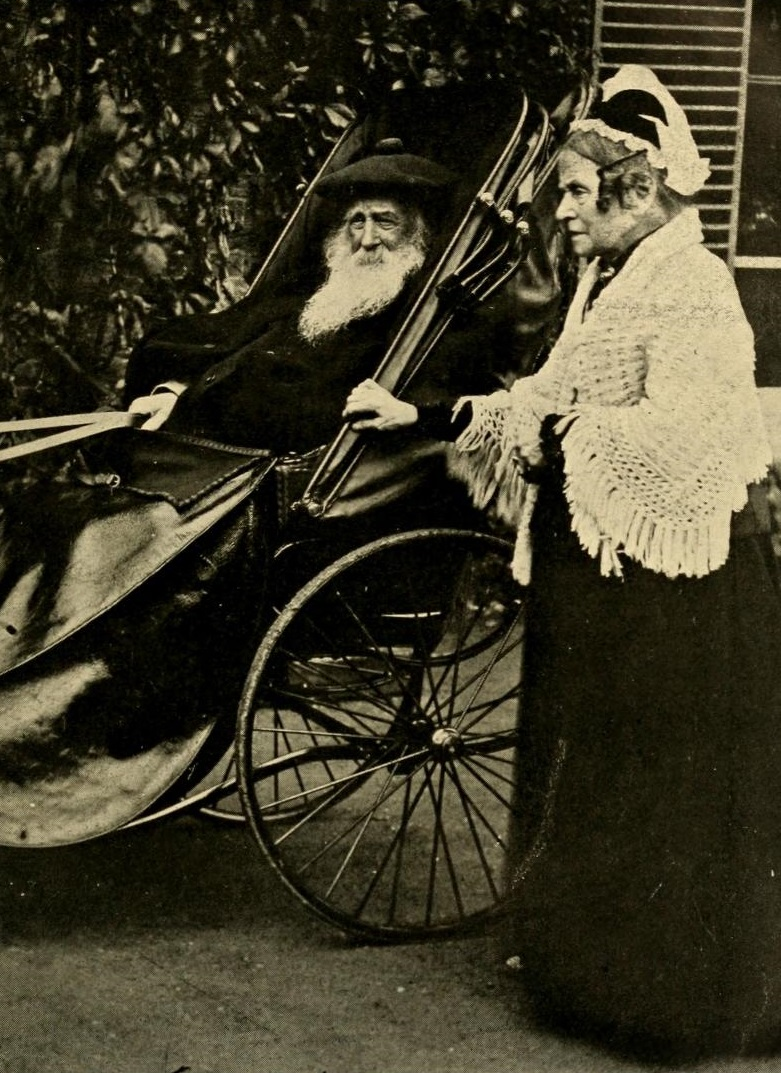
Newson and Louisa Garrett in their old age; from What I Remember by their daughter Millicent Garrett Fawcett

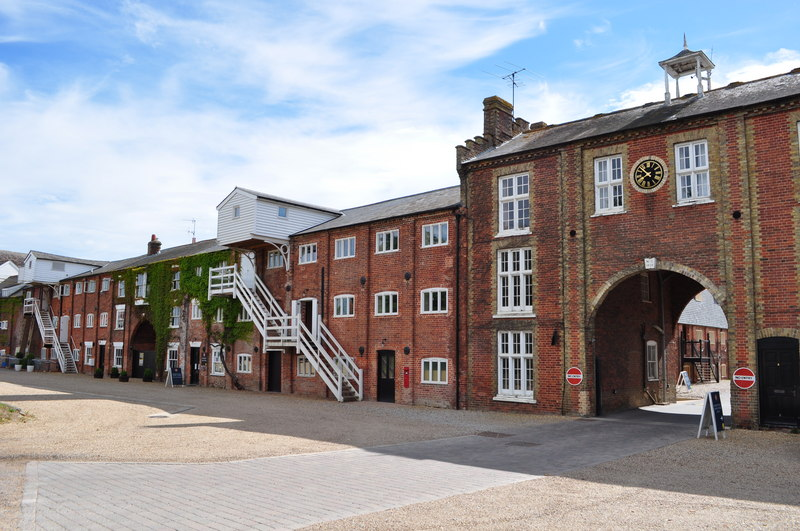
Snape Maltings

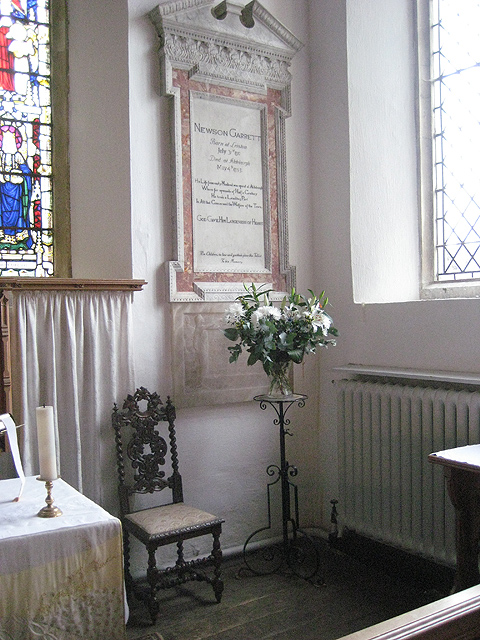
His memorial in the Lady chapel of Aldeburgh parish church

Newson Garrett (31 July 1812 – 4 May 1893) was an English maltster, instrumental in the revival of the town of Aldeburgh, Suffolk, of which he became mayor at the end of his life. His daughter Elizabeth became the first woman in Britain to qualify as a medical doctor. Both his daughters, Millicent and Elizabeth, became famous as women's rights activists.

== Life ==
Born in Leiston in Suffolk, Garrett was the grandson of Richard Garrett, who founded the technical machinery works at Leiston, and Elizabeth Newson, after whom he was named. Newson was the youngest of three sons and not academically inclined, although he possessed the family’s entrepreneurial spirit. When he finished school, the small town of Leiston offered little to Newson, so he left for London to make his fortune. There, he fell in love with his brother's sister-in-law, Louisa Dunnell, the daughter of an innkeeper of Suffolk origin. After their wedding, the couple lived in a pawnbroker's shop at 1 Commercial Road, Whitechapel. The Garretts had their first four children in quick succession: Louisa, Elizabeth (who would become the first woman in Britain to qualify as a physician and surgeon), Dunnell Newson (who died in infancy) and Newson Dunnell. The family moved to 142 Long Acre, where they lived for two years; two more children were born, Edmund in 1840 and Alice in 1842, and Newson moved up in the world, becoming not only the manager of a larger pawnbroker's shop, but also a silversmith. Garrett's grandfather, the owner of the family engineering works, Richard Garrett & Sons, had died in 1837, leaving the business to his eldest son, Garrett's uncle. Despite his lack of capital, Newson was determined to be successful and in 1840 he moved his family to the Uplands in Aldeburgh.

In March 1841, he bought the business of Osborne and Fennell, barley and coal merchants at Snape Bridge. Using the River Alde to transport barley across Britain and into Europe on Thames barges, within three years of his arrival, Garrett was shipping 17,000 quarters (216 t) of barley a year from Snape. Much of this barley would have been destined for breweries, where it had first to be malted. Newson saw an opportunity and in 1854 he began malting at Snape, and was soon shipping malt, rather than barley to the breweries.

Newson's business at Snape Maltings expanded and five more children were born, Agnes (1845), an interior designer; Millicent (1847), a leader in the constitutional campaign for women's suffrage; Samuel (1850), Josephine (1853) and George (1854). A granddaughter Philippa Fawcett was the first woman to rank highest in the Mathematical Tripos examinations at Cambridge. By 1850, Newson was a prosperous businessman and was able to build Alde House, a mansion on a hill behind Aldeburgh.

The success of the maltings established Garrett as an eminent businessman. In 1889, he was elected to the position of mayor of Aldeburgh; fifteen years later his daughter Elizabeth became the first woman mayor in the United Kingdom by taking the same post.

== Death and legacy ==
He was buried in St Peter and St Paul's Church, Aldeburgh, where there is a commemorative plaque on the wall. His widow died at Aldeburgh on 17 January 1903, at the age of 89.

The maltings at Snape Bridge closed in the 1960s but, through the leadership of the composer Benjamin Britten, the site was converted into the Snape Maltings Concert Hall, which has become the principal venue for the annual Aldeburgh Festival.
