= Hubert Garrett =

Australian cricketer

Personal information
- Full name: Hubert Frederic Garrett
- Born: 13 November 1885; Melbourne, Victoria, Australia
- Died: 4 June 1915 (aged 29); Achi Baba, Gallipoli, Ottoman Turkey
- Batting: Right-handed
- Bowling: Right-arm leg-spin
- Role: Bowler

Domestic team information
- Years: Team
- 1913: Somerset
- First-class debut: 23 June 1913 H. D. G. Leveson Gower's XI v Cambridge University
- Last First-class: 6 June 1914 MCC v Cambridge University

Career statistics
Competition	First-class
Matches	11
Runs scored	220
Batting average	12.22
100s/50s	–/–
Top score	37*
Balls bowled	1277
Wickets	34
Bowling average	22.20
5 wickets in innings	2
10 wickets in match	1
Best bowling	6/60
Catches/stumpings	4/–
- Source: CricketArchive, 4 September 2010

Hubert Frederic Garrett (13 November 1885 – 4 June 1915) played first-class cricket for Somerset and for amateur sides in England in 1913 and 1914. He was born in Melbourne, Australia and died near Achi Baba, Ottoman Turkey in the Gallipoli campaign of the First World War.

He was educated at Cambridge University but did not appear in any matches for the university cricket team. A lower-order right-handed batsman and a right-arm leg spin bowler, his first first-class games were for H. D. G. Leveson Gower's side in two festival matches against Cambridge and Oxford universities at Eastbourne in June 1913. His leg-break and googly bowling was an instant success. In the Cambridge match, which was a 12-a-side first-class match, he took eight wickets for 70 runs, including a second innings analysis of five for 39. He improved on those figures in the 11-a-side match against Oxford, taking six for 60 and four for 32 for match figures of 10 for 92. Somerset signed him up and he played in eight first-class matches for the side in the latter stages of the 1913 season, but he was unable to repeat his Eastbourne success, and took only 14 wickets in these games.

In 1914, he made a single first-class appearance for MCC in the match against Cambridge University.

According to his obituary in the 1916 edition of Wisden Cricketers' Almanack, Garrett was killed while serving as a lieutenant in the 9th service battalion of the East Yorkshire Regiment in the Dardanelles campaign.
