= Charles Scott-Garrett =

British chemist, and archeologist

Charles Scott-Garrett (born Charles Scott Garrett, 19 November 1885 – 15 March 1972) was a British chemist and later an archaeologist. He discovered a 3 metre long complete fossil of an Ichthyosaurus on the banks of the Severn at Awre. He played in international rugby trials and was a well known hockey player.

== Life ==
Garrett was born in Carrickfergus, Antrim, Ireland, to Eliza Scott Bell and John Garrett.

== Education and career ==
Garrett was educated at the Belfast Academical Institute, and then at St Andrews University in Scotland, obtaining BSc in chemistry in 1910. He became a Fellow of the Institute of Chemistry the same year. He spent the 1911–1912 academic year at Leipzig University, and during 1914–1916 he was at the University of Liverpool. He was awarded DSc by St Andrews in July 1916 for previously published work.

In December 1916, he married Gladys Browne in Bristol.

Early in WWI, he worked as a chemist at the Speech House Road Distillation Works in the Forest of Dean, for the Ministry of Munitions.

He started using Scott-Garrett as his last name around 1918, when he was awarded an MBE (upon the nomination of Winston Churchill) for his war work. He later worked for Organic Synthetic Chemical Works in Portsmouth. In 1924, he returned to live in the Forest of Dean area, where he remained for decades. He left chemistry behind, and devoted himself to local archaeology.

In 1946, he was a founder member of the Forest of Dean Local History Society, alongside Cyril Hart. He discovered a complete fossil (about 3 metres long) of an Ichthyosaurus on the shore of the Severn river at Awre.

In 1967, Hart published the book Archaeology in Dean; a tribute to Dr C Scott-Garrett, MBE. There are several papers published about Scott-Garrett's research.

He died in Ross-on-Wye, Herefordshire, in 1972.

== Papers ==
- October 2020 The New Regard No 35 Forest of Dean Local History Society – article on the discovery of an Ichthyosaurus
- Scott-Garrett C 1918–1958 "Ramblings of a Dean Archaeologist Notebooks of Scott-Garrett", Gloucestershire County Record Office GRO D3921/II/41
- Scott-Garrett C & Harris FH 1932 "Field Observations between Severn and Wye", Gloucestershire County Record Office AR21
- "Notes on the history of Bourton-on-the-Water; photographs of Cotswold houses, churches, barns, tombstones” compiled by Mrs H E O'Neil c.1935–1975 Dr C Scott-Garrett: antiquarian and archaeological notes c.1930–1960
- "Copies and transcripts, subject files, topographical files, maps and plans, pamphlets and photographs concerning the history and archaeology of the Forest of Dean, its industries and woods" (1199)-2005, Dr C Scott-Garrett: archaeological notes c.1925–1960
