= Greg Garrett (writer) =

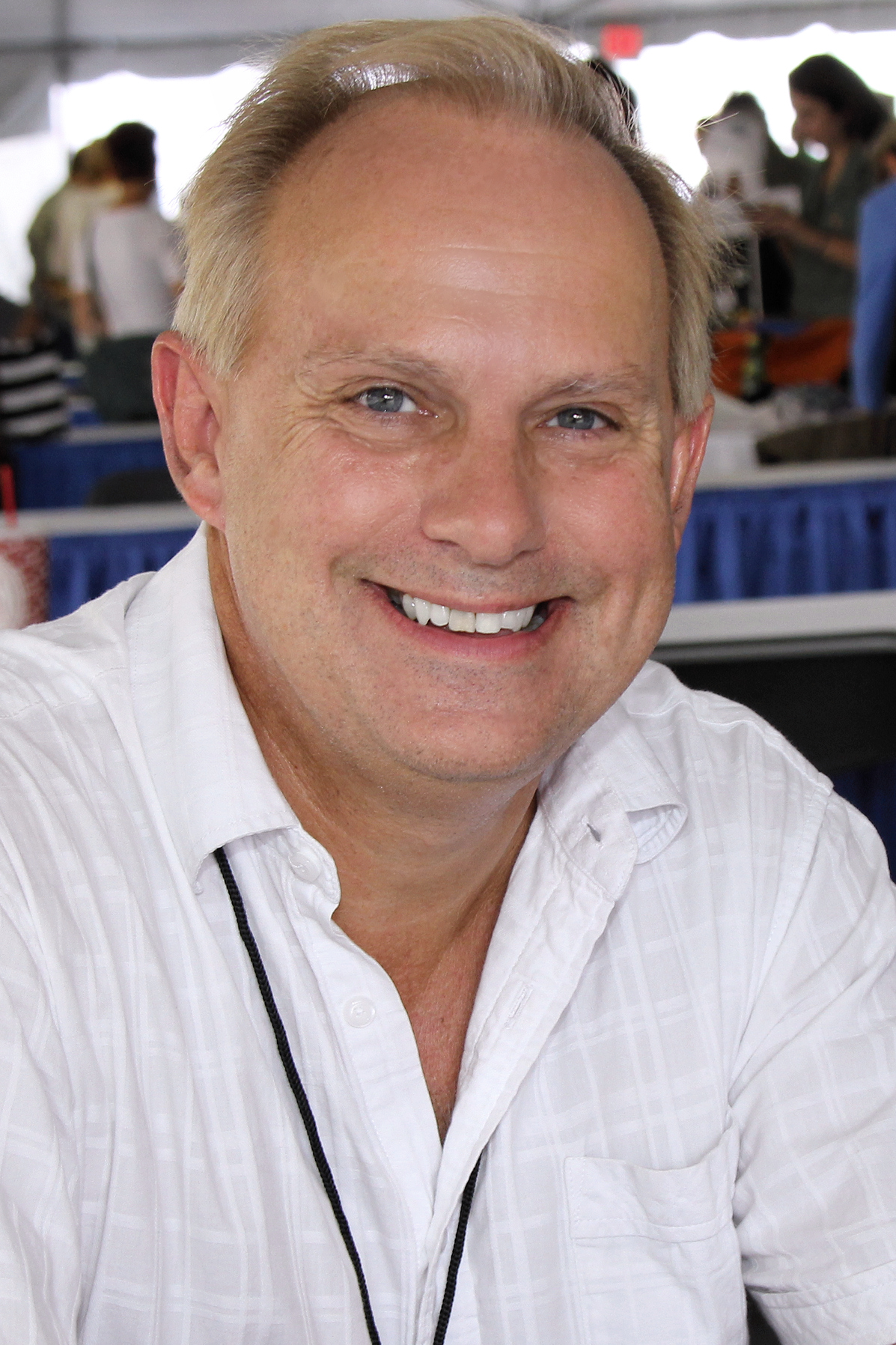
- Garrett at the 2017 Texas Book Festival
- Born: November 6, 1961 (age 64); Oklahoma City, Oklahoma, U.S.
- Education: University of Central Oklahoma (BA, MA); Oklahoma State University (PhD)
- Occupations: Author, professor, preacher
- Spouse: Jeanie Garrett
- Children: 4
- Writing career
- Genres: Fiction, nonfiction, memoir
- Subjects: Religion, film, pop culture, spirituality
- Notable works: Free Bird, Holy Superheroes!
- Notable awards: William Faulkner Prize for Fiction (1993)
- Website: The Other Jesus

Greg Garrett (born November 6, 1961, in Oklahoma City, Oklahoma) is a writer, professor, speaker, preacher, and musician based in Austin, Texas.

== Education ==
Born November 6, 1961, in Oklahoma City, Oklahoma, Garrett attended Mustang High School in Mustang, Oklahoma. He then went on to the University of Central Oklahoma, where he received his B.A. in English with a minor in History and was a member of Alpha Chi and Phi Alpha Theta national honor societies. He continued his education at University of Central Oklahoma, receiving an M.A. in Creative Studies (his thesis was a novel, Bicentennial Summer).

Greg received his PhD in English from Oklahoma State University in 1989. His dissertation was Bloodmetal, a screenplay. He continued his education with post-doctoral studies in Holocaust Studies at University of Oregon in 1997, and received a Masters of Divinity from the Episcopal Theological Seminary of the Southwest in Austin, Texas, in 2007.

== Literary career ==
=== Fiction ===
Garrett's novel Free Bird was published in 2002. It drew favorable critical attention and was a publisher nominee for the 2002 Pulitzer Prize and the National Book Award. It was also a Publishers Weekly First Fiction honoree and a finalist for the Violet Crown Award for Texas letters.

Cycling, a novel published in 2003, was a finalist for the William Faulkner Prize for Fiction, the James Jones First Novel Fellowship, the Bakeless Literary Prize, and the Violet Crown Award for Texas Letters. It was also a publisher nominee for the 2003 National Book Award. He has since published the novels Shame (2009) and The Prodigal (2013).

=== Nonfiction and Memoirs ===
Garrett has written a number of nonfiction works on religion and pop culture, including The Gospel Reloaded: Exploring Spirituality and Faith in the Matrix (with Chris Seay) (nominated for the 2004 Gold Medallion Book Award), Holy Superheroes! Exploring the Sacred in Comics, Graphic Novels, and Film, and The Gospel According to Hollywood. He is an author of The Voice, a forthcoming contemporary language Bible (his The Voice of Mark and The Voice of Hebrews were published in 2008).

Crossing Myself, Garrett's spiritual autobiography, was published in 2006. A second memoir, No Idea appeared in 2009. Stories from the Edge: A Theology of Grief, was published in August 2008.

=== Other work ===
Garrett has also written hundreds of short stories, book reviews, essays, and scholarly articles for publications ranging from Salon.com to The Washington Post. His novella Minuet won the William Faulkner Prize for Fiction in 1993. He won a regional CASE gold medalist for nonfiction and was elected to the Texas Institute of Letters in 2005.

== Professional and personal life ==
Garrett became a professor of English at Baylor University in Waco, Texas, in 1989. In 1998 he was named Outstanding Professor by Baylor's student congress and Outstanding Faculty Member by the university administration. His courses at Baylor include studies of writing, film, literature, and theology. He was the founding director of Baylor's Art & Soul Festival, a festival celebrating faith and the arts, from 1999 to 2002. In 2013, he was named the Baylor University Centennial Professor, and pursued research leading to his book Entertaining Judgment. Garrett was later appointed Carole McDaniel Hanks Professor of Literature and Culture.

He is the Writer in Residence at the Episcopal Theological Seminary of the Southwest and a lay preacher at St. David's Episcopal Church, both in Austin, Texas.

Garrett also teaches classes, workshops, retreats, and seminars in writing, religion and culture, theology, spirituality, and other topics for conference centers, conferences, schools, universities, seminaries, and organizations around the U.S. and overseas.

As of 2016 Garrett resided in Austin, Texas. He is married to Jeanie Garrett, a former broadcast journalist and communications specialist. He has two sons, Jacob and Chandler, and he and Jeanie have two daughters, Lily and Sophia.
