= Rachael D. Garrett =

Professor of geography

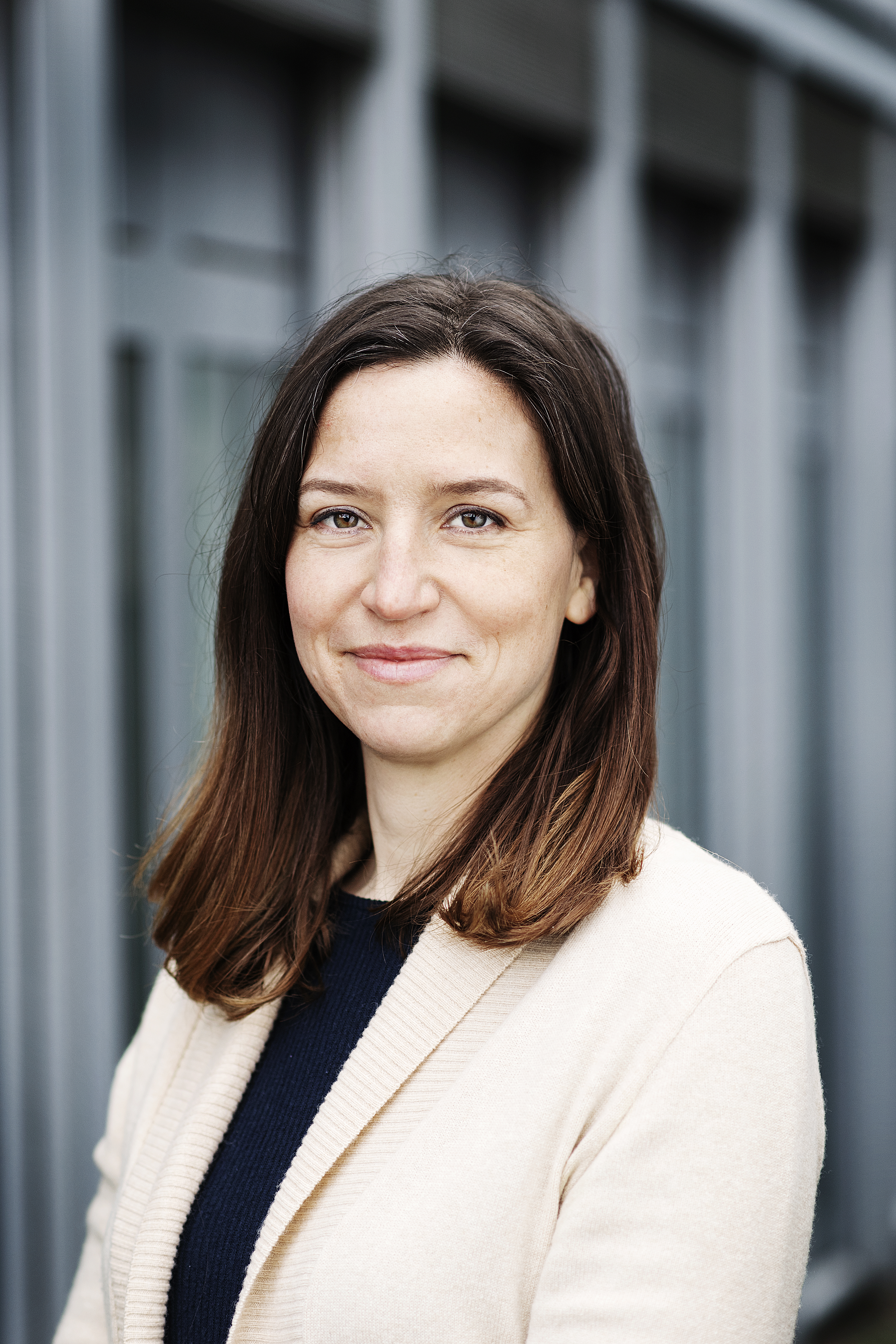
- Born: Connecticut
- Occupations: Moran Professor of Conservation and Development
- Awards: 2026 Fellow of the British Ecological Society

Academic background
- Education: BA Boston University MPA Columbia University PhD Stanford University
- Thesis: (2013)

Academic work
- Discipline: Land systems science
- Website: https://www.geog.cam.ac.uk/people/garrett/

Rachael D. Garrett is the Moran Professor of Conservation and Development at the University of Cambridge. She is known for her work on factors impacting land change, especially with respect to farmers.

== Background ==
Garrett received her B.A. from Boston University in 2003 and an M.P.A. from Columbia University in 2006. She earned her Ph.D. from Stanford University in 2013. She did her post-doc in sustainability science at Harvard University and subsequently was an assistant professor at Boston University and then ETH Zurich before accepting a position at the University of Cambridge. As of 2022 she is the Moran Professor of Conservation and Development at the University of Cambridge.

In January 20256 Garrett was elected a Fellow of the British Ecological Society.
