= George Garrett (hurler) =

Irish hurler

Personal information
- Native name: Seoirse Mac Gearóid (Irish)
- Born: 23 December 1908 Castleview Street, Cork, Ireland
- Died: 19 January 1969 (aged 60) Old Blackrock Road, Cork, Ireland
- Occupation: Welder

Sport
- Sport: Hurling
- Position: Centre-back
Club
- Years: Club
- Blackrock
Club titles
- Cork titles: 3
Inter-county*
Years	County	Apps (scores)
1931-1938	Cork	12 (0-3)
Inter-county titles
- Munster titles: 1
- All-Irelands: 1
- NHL: 0
- *Inter County team apps and scores correct as of 15:55, 8 August 2013.

George Christopher Garrett (23 December 1908 – 19 January 1969) was an Irish hurler who played as a centre-back for the Cork senior team.

Born in Cork, Garrett first arrived on the inter-county scene at the age of twenty-two when he joined the Cork senior team for the 1931 championship. Garrett went on to play a key role for Cork in what was a decade-long barren spell for the team, and won one All-Ireland medal.

As a member of the Munster inter-provincial team for five years, Garrett won one Railway Cup medal in 1934. At club level he won three successive championship medals with Blackrock.

Throughout his career Garrett made 12 championship appearances. His retirement came following Cork's defeat by Waterford in the 1938 championship.

== Honours ==
=== Team ===
Blackrock

- Cork Senior Hurling Championship (3): 1929, 1930, 1931

Cork

- All-Ireland Senior Hurling Championship (1): 1931
- Munster Senior Hurling Championship (1): 1931 (sub)

Munster

- Railway Cup (1): 1934
