= Richard Garrett (author) =

Richard Garrett (15 January 1920 – 29 July 2008) was an English author and an ex-prisoner of war.

== Biography ==
Richard Garrett joined up in 1939 and was made a second lieutenant in the Notts and Derby Regiment (the Sherwood Foresters) at the outbreak of war. In 1940 he formed part of the ill-fated Allied campaign in Norway. After an abortive action near Lillehammer, in which unprepared British troops underwent a determined aerial attack by the Germans, he found himself, with fifteen other men, separated from the main British force. It was decided to make for the North Sea coast, a 300-mile trek across the highest mountain range in Scandinavia. Travelling only at night the men reached the Sognefjord on Whit Sunday 1940. Since the Germans were already there, it was decided to continue to Eikfjord where a fishing boat was acquired on the strength of a £100 iou (which was honoured at the end of the war). From there they crossed the North Sea back to the Shetland Islands.

During his time stationed back in Britain he suffered a fall from a horse leaving him with severe concussion, but was finally passed as fit for service and took part in Operation Torch, the invasion of Tunisia. On 28 February 1943, whilst attempting to help one of his men who had been wounded, he was taken prisoner. Initially handed over to the Italians, he was held prisoner in Capua, Italy and near Modena. With the fall of Mussolini, prisoners of war were transported to Germany and Garrett spent most of the remainder of the war in Oflag Va, Weinsberg (see List of prisoner-of-war camps in Germany) near Stuttgart. In late spring 1945 the prisoners were moved to Moosburg, near Munich, where they were Liberated by American troops. His return to England was featured in the documentary "The Day the War Ended" on BBC television.

His postwar career included founding and running a company producing house magazines for large corporations and an involvement in the British motor racing scene of the sixties and seventies. He wrote forty-five books. He died on 29 July 2008.

== Publications ==
- Great Sea Mysteries (1971)
- True Tales of Detection (1972)
- Narrow Squeaks: Real Life Stories of Miraculous Escapes (1973)
- General Gordon (1974)
- Famous Characters of the Wild West (1975)
- Stories of Famous Natural Disasters (1976)
- Famous Rescues at Sea (1977)
- Scharnhorst and Gneisenau: The Elusive Sisters (1978)
- Hoaxes and Swindles (1979)
- Aliens from Outer Space (1983)
- Atlantic Disaster: Man's War Against the North Atlantic (1986)
- Flight into Mystery: Reports from the Dark Side of the Sky (1986)
- Great Escapes of World War II (1989) ISBN 0-297-79416-7
- Voyage into Mystery: Reports from the Sinister Side of the Sea (1991)
