= George T. Garrett =

US Army major general (born 1944)

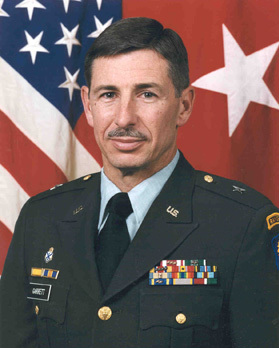
- Garrett in 2002
- Born: February 23, 1944 (age 82); Washington, D.C., US
- Education: West Virginia University; Monmouth University; United States Army Command and General Staff College; United States Army War College
- Spouse: Dorothy Jacob (m. 1965)
- Children: 1
- Military career
- Service: United States Army
- Service years: 1966–2002
- Rank: Major General
- Units: U.S. Army Field Artillery Branch; U.S. Army Armor Branch; U.S. Army Infantry Branch
- Commands: Battery A, 5th Battalion, 38th Field Artillery Regiment; Company C, 4th Battalion, 102nd Armor Regiment; 1st Battalion, 114th Infantry Regiment; 2nd Battalion, 114th Infantry Regiment; 2nd Brigade, 50th Armored Division; 1st Brigade, 50th Armored Division; Combat Arms Branch, 1st Brigade, 78th Division; Training Division, New Jersey State Area Command; 42nd Infantry Division
- Conflicts: Korean DMZ Conflict
- Awards: Meritorious Service Medal; Army Commendation Medal
- Other work: Senior Training Specialist, Novartis Pharmaceuticals; Director of Homeland Security, New Jersey Department of Military and Veterans Affairs

George Thomas Garrett (born 23 February 1944) is a retired career United States Army officer. A longtime member of the New Jersey Army National Guard, he attained the rank of major general as commander of the 42nd Infantry Division, which he led from 1999 to 2002.

Garrett was born in Washington, DC, and raised and educated on military bases as his family traveled for his father's career in the United States Navy. He graduated from Chula Vista High School in 1962 and West Virginia University in 1966.

While in college, Garrett took part in the Army Reserve Officers' Training Corps, and he received his second lieutenant's commission in the Field Artillery. He served in the regular army until 1970, including command of a battery during the Korean DMZ Conflict in 1968 and 1969. After completing his regular army service, Garrett joined the United States Army Reserve, and he soon afterwards transferred his military membership to the New Jersey National Guard. Garrett pursued a civilian career as a training specialist with CIBA (later known as Novartis) and received his Master of Business Administration degree from Monmouth College in 1976.

Garrett advanced through the ranks of the National Guard and Army Reserve in staff and command assignments, and his command positions between 1971 and 1992 included an armor company, two infantry battalions, and two armor brigades. In October 1996, he was assigned as assistant division commander of the 42nd Infantry Division, and he was promoted to brigadier general in 1997. In October 1999, he was appointed as the division commander, and he was promoted to major general in October 2000. Garrett commanded the 42nd Division until retiring from the military in September 2002. After his military retirement, Garrett served as Director of Homeland Security for the State of New Jersey's Division of Military and Veteran's Affairs.

== Early life ==
George Thomas Garrett (Known as G. Thomas, Thomas, or Tom) was born in Washington, D.C. on 23 February 1944, a son of Hartzell Garrett and Frances (Guyot) Garrett. Garrett's father served in the United States Navy and Garrett was raised and educated on several naval bases. He graduated from Chula Vista, California's Chula Vista High School in 1962. After high school, he attended West Virginia University (WVU), from which he graduated with a Bachelor of Science degree in forestry in 1966. Garrett took part in the Army Reserve Officers' Training Corps program at WVU, which he completed as a distinguished graduate.

After college, Garrett received his commission as a second lieutenant of Field Artillery. He was assigned to the United States Army Reserve Control Group (Reinforcement) from July 1966 to February 1967. He completed the Field Artillery Officer Basic Course at Fort Sill, Oklahoma in April 1967, then moved on to Ranger School at Fort Benning, Georgia, which he completed in June.

=== Family ===
In 1965, Garrett married Dorothy "Dot" Jacob. They were the parents of a daughter, Tamela "Tammy" Garrett.

== Start of career ==
From July 1967 to January 1968, Garrett was assigned as assistant executive officer of Battery D, 2nd Battalion, 2nd Field Artillery Regiment at Fort Sill. From January to February 1968, he was a student in the Survey Officer Course at the Fort Sill Field Artillery School. He was then posted to South Korea during the Korean DMZ Conflict, where he served as executive officer of Battery A, 5th Battalion, 38th Field Artillery from March to May. He was promoted to first lieutenant in January 1968. From May 1968 to May 1969, he commanded Battery A. In January 1969, Garrett was promoted to captain. From May 1969 until leaving the regular army in March 1970, Garrett was assigned as Fort Sill's acting inspector general.

From April 1970 to July 1971, Garrett served as liaison officer on the staff of the United States Army Reserve's 3rd Battalion, 15th Field Artillery Regiment, 157th Infantry Brigade in Edgemont, Pennsylvania. He then transferred his military membership to the New Jersey Army National Guard, and he served as assistant plans, training and operations officer (S-3 Air) for 2nd Battalion, 50th Armored Division in Red Bank, New Jersey, where he served until December. From December 1971 to November 1972, he commanded Company C, 4th Battalion, 102nd Armor Regiment. From December 1972 to April 1973, he was liaison officer on the staff of 4th Battalion, 102nd Armor. From May 1973 to May 1976, Garrett was assigned as assistant logistics staff officer (S-4) for 1st Brigade, 50th Armored Division. In May 1976, Garrett completed a Master of Business Administration degree at Monmouth College (now Monmouth University). He served as the brigade's assistant S-3 from May to October 1976, when he was appointed as assistant inspector general at the 50th Armored Division headquarters. He served in this position until January 1979 and was promoted to major in April 1977.

== Continued career ==
From February 1979 to August 1981, Garrett completed the United States Army Command and General Staff College while serving as executive officer of 1st Battalion, 114th Infantry Regiment in Woodbury, New Jersey. He was the battalion commander from September 1981 to August 1982, and he was promoted to lieutenant colonel in September 1981. From September 1982 to July 1985, he commanded 2nd Battalion, 114th Infantry in Long Branch, New Jersey. From August 1985 to March 1989, Garrett served as executive officer of 2nd Brigade, 50th Armored Division in Cherry Hill, New Jersey. In 1985, he also graduated from the United States Army War College. He was promoted to colonel in April 1989 and assigned as the brigade commander. From March 1990 to November 1992, he commanded 1st Brigade, 50th Armored Division. He was the public information officer on the staff of the New Jersey National Guard's State Area Command from December 1992 to March 1993. From November 1994 to November 1995, he was assigned to the Army Reserve's 1st Brigade, 78th Training Division as executive officer.

Garrett served again at New Jersey's state headquarters beginning in November 1995, first as chief of the training division, and later as Selective Service officer. From March to September 1996, he served as deputy commander of New Jersey's State Area Command. In October 1996, he was assigned as assistant division commander of the 42nd Infantry Division, and he was promoted to brigadier general in March 1997. From October 1999 to his retirement in September 2002, Garrett commanded the 42nd Division, and he was promoted to major general in October 2000. After retiring from the military, Garrett served as director of homeland security for New Jersey's Division of Military and Veteran's Affairs. In addition, he was involved in local government as a member of the Freehold, New Jersey school board.

== Awards ==
Among Garrett's awards were:

- Meritorious Service Medal with 3 oak leaf clusters
- Army Commendation Medal with 2 oak leaf clusters
- Army Reserve Components Achievement Medal with 7 oak leaf clusters
- National Defense Service Medal with 1 bronze service star
- Armed Forces Expeditionary Medal
- Armed Forces Reserve Medal with gold hour glass device
- Army Service Ribbon
- Overseas Service Ribbon

== Dates of rank ==
Garrett's dates of rank were:

- Major General, 6 October 2000
- Brigadier General, 27 March 1997
- Colonel, 1 April 1989
- Lieutenant Colonel, 10 September 1981
- Major, 6 April 1977
- Captain, 28 January 1969
- First Lieutenant, 28 January 1968
- Second Lieutenant, 29 July 1966
