= Jeremiah Learnoult Garrett =

English minister (c.1809–??)

Jeremiah Learnoult Garrett (fl. 1809) was an English dissenting minister.

== Life ==
Garrett was born at Horselydown, Southwark, near the Old Stairs, on 29 February 1764. His parents were boatbuilders. Before he was eight he had 'strict views of the world being burnt up, and the wicked being turned into hell.' Soon after this date his father died. He was now sent to school, first at Christ's College, Hertford, and afterwards at Jackson's Academy, Hampton. He was then set to learn the tailoring trade, but disliking it was apprenticed to a builder of ship's boats at Wapping, who ill-used him. His master absconding for debt, he was apprenticed to another in the same business.

At the age of fourteen or fifteen he had a vision of an "ancient form", which he took to be Jesus Christ. A dissenting minister was called in to see him, to whom he confessed his sins; the minister 'pointed him to the blood of Christ.' Subsequently, however, he took to vicious courses, had a man-of-war's man who had assaulted him arrested, frequented theatres, fought with his fellow-apprentice, contracted debts, and a disease for which he was treated in the London Lock Hospital. On emerging from the hospital he attended the ministrations of John Wesley's preachers, as well as the services of the church, used 'to go out into the fields, and rave hell and damnation to sinners.', and came to be called a second George Whitefield by the old women in Moorfields. A mysterious find of £80 in his bed enabled him to pay his debts.

At a somewhat later period he held forth at the old Rectifying House and the old Soap House, Islington, and in 1788 he laid the foundation-stone of the chapel since known as Islington Chapel in Church Street. He was received into Lady Huntingdon's Connexion and ordained. About this time he married. He moved to Basingstoke, then to Wallingford, Oxfordshire, and later spent some three years in Guernsey. Returning to England, he ministered for a time at Ashby-de-la-Zouch, but his views on baptism caused his ejection from Lady Huntingdon's Connexion.

Garrett went into the business of a cotton dyer at Leicester. He soon, however, resumed preaching, and, after ministering for some time at Nottingham, established himself just before 1800 at Lant Street Chapel, in the Borough, Southwark, having also a lecture at Monkwell Street Chapel, London. His views seem to have inclined to antinomianism. The date of his death is uncertain.

== Works ==
He published:

- 'The Power of an Endless Life contrasted with the Law of a Carnal Commandment. A Sermon preached at Monkwell Street on Thursday, 5 March 1801,' London, 1801.
- 'Rays of Everlasting Life,' not later than 1803.
- 'Democracy detected, Visionary Enthusiasm corrected; or Sixpennyworth of Good Advice selected from the Scriptures of Truth,' London, 1804 (?) (an attack on Joanna Southcott, to which she replied in 'Answer to Garrett's Book, and an Explanation of the word Bride, the Lamb's Wife, in the Revelations,' London, 1805).
- 'The Songs of Sion. Principally designed for the use of Churches and Congregations distinguished by the name of the Children of Sion,' London, 1804?.
- 'Huntington corrected, and Garrett's Doctrine protected from the Misconstruction of the Disaffected; or a Reply to a Book lately published called "The Doctrine of Garrett refuted by William Huntington,"' Southwark, 1808. The controversy related to the doctrine of the eternal sonship of Christ, which Huntington accused Garrett of denying.

A plate of Garrett's head is in Southcott's 'Answer.'
