= James Rube Garrett Jr. =

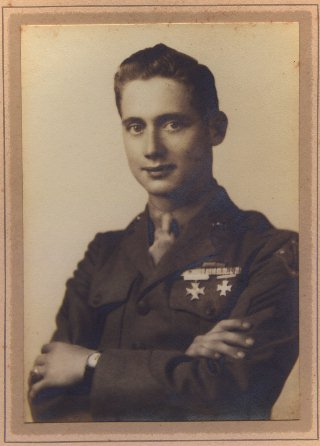
- Born: June 5, 1922; Milligan, Florida, U.S.
- Died: March 6, 2011 (aged 88); Fort Walton Beach, Florida, U.S.
- Military career
- Allegiance: United States
- Branch: United States Marine Corps
- Rank: Corporal
- Units: 11th Marine Regiment, 1st Marine Division
- Conflict: World War II; Guadalcanal campaign

James Rube Garrett Jr. (June 5, 1922 – March 6, 2011) was an author and United States Marine Corps officer. He is known for writing A Marine Diary: My Experiences on Guadalcanal.

== Early life ==
Garrett was born in Milligan, Florida, and raised in Edinburg, Texas, the son of James Rube Garrett and Bettie V. Skinner Garrett. He lived in Geneva, Alabama, with his widowed mother and two siblings after 1938.

== Military career ==
Garrett joined the United States Marines in August 1940. He held the position of Ammo Chief for I Battery, 3rd Battalion, 11th Marines, while serving as a corporal in the Marine Corps. He was also a charter member of the 1st Marine Division, which was established in Cuba in 1940. Garrett wrote diaries and letters during World War II, recording his experiences in the Solomon Islands during his four months of combat during the Guadalcanal campaign. He was discharged from the Marines in October 1945.

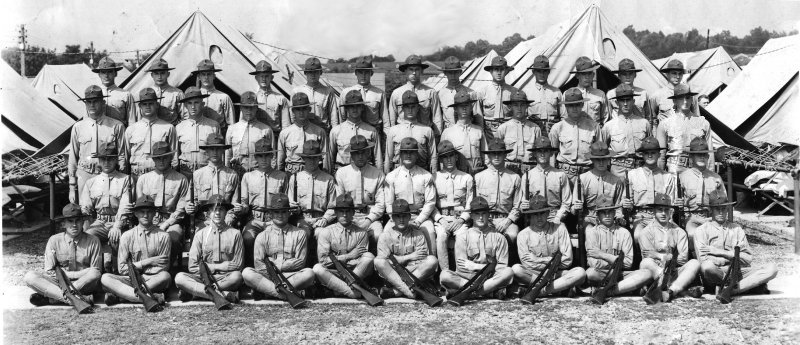
13th Platoon Boot Camp, Marine Corps Base Quantico, Virginia, 1940

=== Excerpt from A Marine Diary ===
"They flew in low, about 50 feet over the water. I remember we had 30 or 40 or 50 ships sitting in the harbor there, and tall grass covered dunes which you could get on and pretty much have a panoramic view of the whole bay. I remember seeing a big air raid come in and black anti-aircraft fire was coming crazy from all the ships in the harbor -- all kind of puffs of smoke hit the sky. In fact there were 16 torpedo bombers come over and I don't think they hit a thing; they were all being shot down and I think one or two got past the fleet. Our planes were after them too. And way out there on the horizon, we saw the last one go down -- all of them were shot down -- we could see the fire and the smoke. These were big two motor bombers: Japanese bombers burn real good." - Excerpt from A Marine Diary: My Experiences on Guadalcanal

== Later years ==
Garrett married Margaret Hatcher in 1943; he sold insurance and managed a car dealership in Hartford, Alabama, after the war. The Garretts had three children and divorced in 1968. His widow was Ute Schwarzenburger Garrett. He died in 2011, at the age of 88, in Fort Walton Beach, Florida.

== See also ==
- List of World War II battles
