= George Garrett (activist) =

British trade unionist (1896–1966)

George Garrett (13 August 1896 – 28 May 1966) was a British labour activist, writer and actor. He was a member of the Industrial Workers of the World, and notable working class writer.

== Biography ==
Garrett was born in Seacombe, Cheshire, England, on 13 August 1896. His father, Samuel Garrett, was the son of Irish Protestant migrants. His mother, Catherine McAndrew, was the daughter of Irish Catholic migrants. After marrying in Liverpool in 1891 his Liverpool-born parents moved to Seacombe. Garrett lived most of his life in Liverpool where he is remembered as a labour activist.

Garrett was a merchant seaman, writer, playwright and founder member of the Unity Theatre, Liverpool. He was a radical activist who travelled the world and wrote a series of short stories, plays and pieces of reportage about hunger and unemployment in the 1930s. He was a syndicalist who joined the Industrial Workers of the World when he lived in New York for three years, and was influenced by the Irish American Playwright Eugene O'Neill.

He died of throat cancer on 28 May 1966.

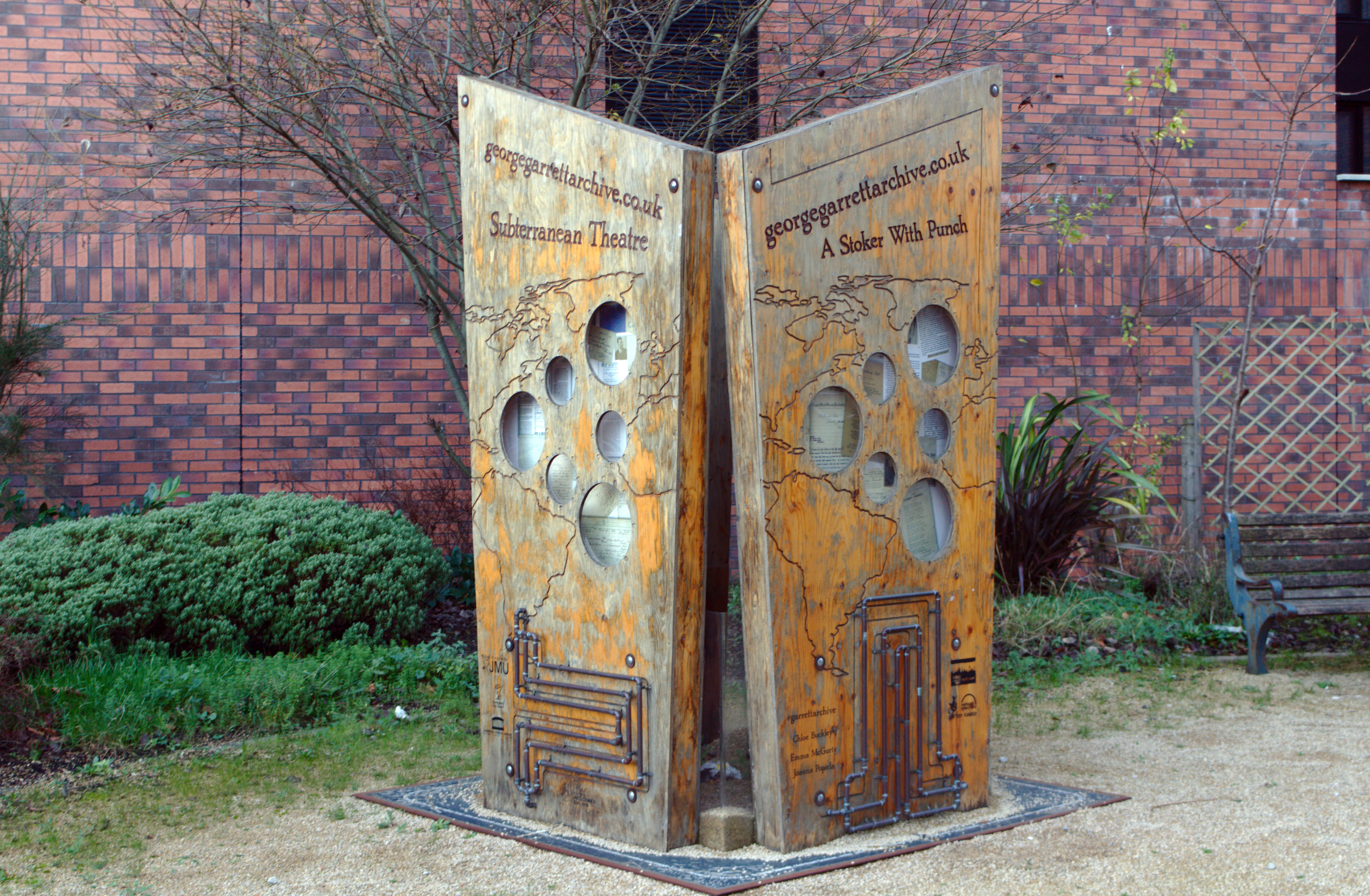
Memorial to Garrett at 54 St James Street, Liverpool

== See also ==
- James Hanley (novelist)
- Proletarian fiction
