= James Leo Garrett Jr. =

American theologian (1925–2020)

James Leo Garrett Jr. (November 25, 1925 – February 5, 2020) was an American theologian. He held the position of Distinguished Professor Emeritus of Theology at Southwestern Baptist Theological Seminary in Fort Worth, Texas.

== Personal ==
Garrett was born in Waco, Texas to James Leo Garrett Sr., a business teacher at Baylor University and his wife, Grace Hasseltine Jenkins Garrett. He was converted in 1935 and was baptized into membership at the Seventh and James Baptist Church in Waco. He was licensed and ordained to the gospel ministry by the First Baptist Church of Waco.

He earned a Bachelor of Arts in English from Baylor University in 1945, a Bachelor of Divinity from Southwestern Baptist Theological Seminary in 1948, a Master's of Theology from Princeton Theological Seminary in 1949, a Doctor of Theology from Southwestern Baptist Theological Seminary in 1954, and a Doctor of Philosophy from Harvard University in 1966. He carried out additional studies at the Catholic University of America, in Washington D.C., Oxford University, St. John's University, and Trinity Evangelical Divinity School in Deerfield, Illinois.

He died in February 2020 at the age of 94.

== Career ==
In his long academic career, he has taught at Southwestern Baptist Seminary (1949–1959, 1979–), Southern Baptist Theological Seminary in Louisville, Kentucky (1959–1973) and Baylor University in Waco, Texas (1973–1979). He has also been a visiting professor at the Hong Kong Baptist Theological Seminary. He has also been a guest lecturer in the countries of Mexico, Brazil, Uruguay, Colombia, the Ukraine, and Romania, and at several schools in the United States.

In 1965, he attended the final session of the Second Vatican Council, as a guest of the Secretariat for Promoting Christian Unity; he later wrote his Harvard PhD dissertation on American Protestants’ writings on Roman Catholicism between the two Vatican councils.

While a student at Southwestern, he pastored three small Baptist churches, and has served as an interim pastor for several Baptist churches. He has authored several volumes, including Baptist Church Discipline in 1962, Baptists and Roman Catholicism published in 1965 by Broadman Press and We Baptists in 1999. He is best known for his two volume Systematic Theology: Biblical, Historical, and Evangelical. He has contributed articles to twenty-one other books and authored hundreds of journal articles, encyclopedia articles, and book reviews.

== Family ==
He married Myrta Ann, a librarian, and they had three children.

== Sources ==
- Basden, Paul A. "James Leo Garrett" in Baptist Theology and Theologians (Nashville: Broadman & Holman, 2001)

== Selected Readings ==
- James Leo Garrett (2017). W. L. Richardson (ed.). The Collected Writings of James Leo Garrett Jr., 1950–2015: Volume One: Baptists. Eugene, Oregon: Wipf and Stock. ISBN 978-1-5326-0730-1.
- James Leo Garrett (2018). W. L. Richardson (ed.). The Collected Writings of James Leo Garrett Jr., 1950-2015: Volume Two: Baptists, Part II. Eugene, Oregon: Wipf and Stock. ISBN 978-1-5326-0732-5.
- James Leo Garrett (2009). Baptist Theology: A Four-century Study. Mercer University Press. ISBN 978-0-88146-129-9.
- James Leo Garrett (2014). Systematic Theology, Volume 1, Fourth Edition: Biblical, Historical, and Evangelical. Eugene, Oregon: Wipf and Stock. ISBN 978-1-4982-0659-4.
- James Leo Garrett (2014). Systematic Theology, Volume 2, Second Edition: Biblical, Historical, and Evangelical. Eugene, Oregon: Wipf and Stock. ISBN 978-1-4982-0660-0.
- James Leo Garrett; E. Glenn Hinson; James E. Tull (1983). Are Southern Baptists "Evangelicals"?. Mercer University Press. ISBN 978-0-86554-033-0.
