= George Garrett (MP) =

English politician

Sir George Garrett (died 30 November 1648) was an English politician who sat in the House of Commons in 1640.

Garrett was secretary to Miles Fleetwood. In April 1640, he was elected Member of Parliament for Hindon in the Short Parliament.

Garrett was a member of the Worshipful Company of Drapers. He was elected Alderman of the City of London for Castle Baynard ward on 15 April 1641. He was Sheriff of London and Master of the Drapers Company from 1641 to 1642. He was knighted on 3 December 1641.

Parliament of England
Vacant Parliament suspended since 1629	Member of Parliament for Hindon; 1640; With: Sir Miles Fleetwood	Succeeded by Sir Miles Fleetwood; Robert Reynolds
