= Agnes Garrett =

English suffragist and interior designer (1845–1935)

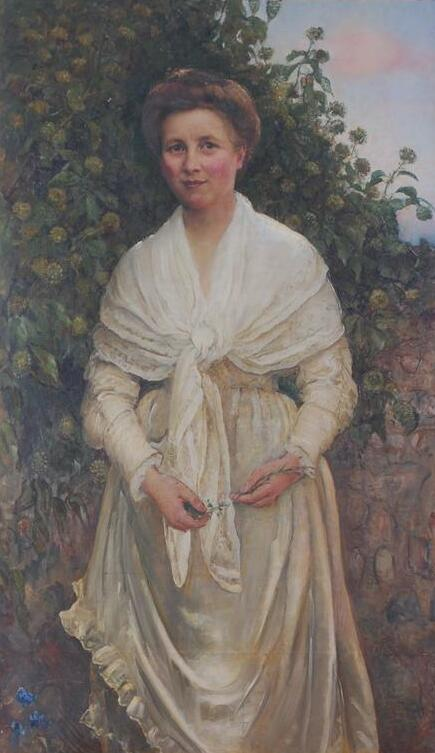
- Agnes Garrett by Annie Swynnerton
- Born: 12 July 1845; Aldeburgh
- Died: 19 March 1935; Gower Street
- Occupations: Interior designer, suffragist, interior architect
- Father: Newson Garrett
- Relatives: Elizabeth Garrett Anderson, Millicent Fawcett

Agnes Garrett (12 July 1845 – 1935) was an English suffragist and interior designer and the founder in 1888 of the Ladies Dwellings Company.

== Life ==
Garrett was the daughter of Newson Garrett (1812–1893), a prosperous merchant, and Louisa Garrett (née Dunnell; 1813–1903). She was the seventh of eleven children. She attended a boarding school at Blackheath, near London.

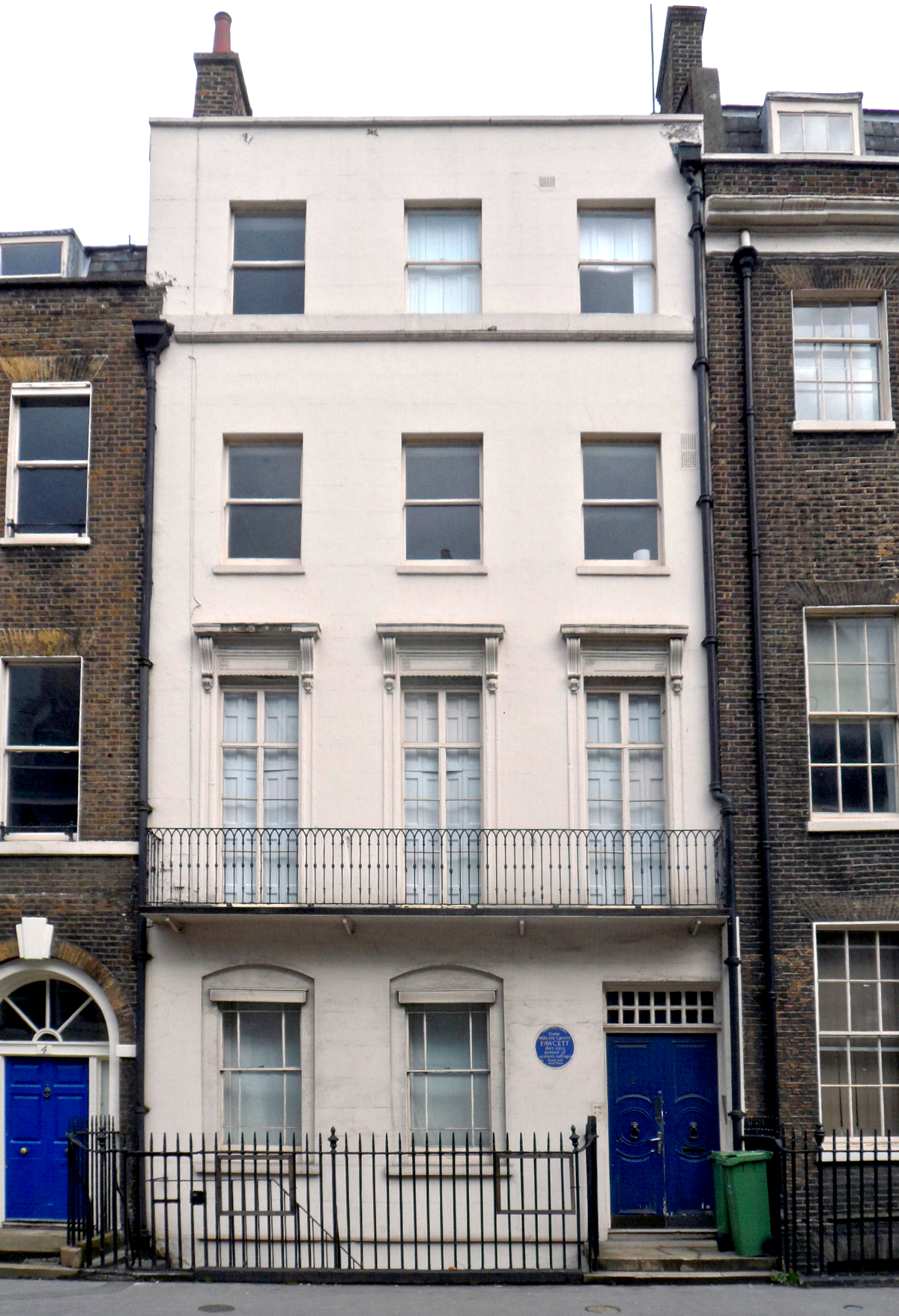
No. 2, Gower Street in Bloomsbury

She and her cousin Rhoda Garrett were employed by London architect John McKean Brydon in 1871, giving them an entry into training that no other practice was willing to allow, as architecture was not considered suitable for women. The cousins opened the first interior design company in Britain to be run by women. R & A Garrett opened in mid 1875, in a flat behind Baker Street station, moving to 2 Gower Street in Bloomsbury c.1884.

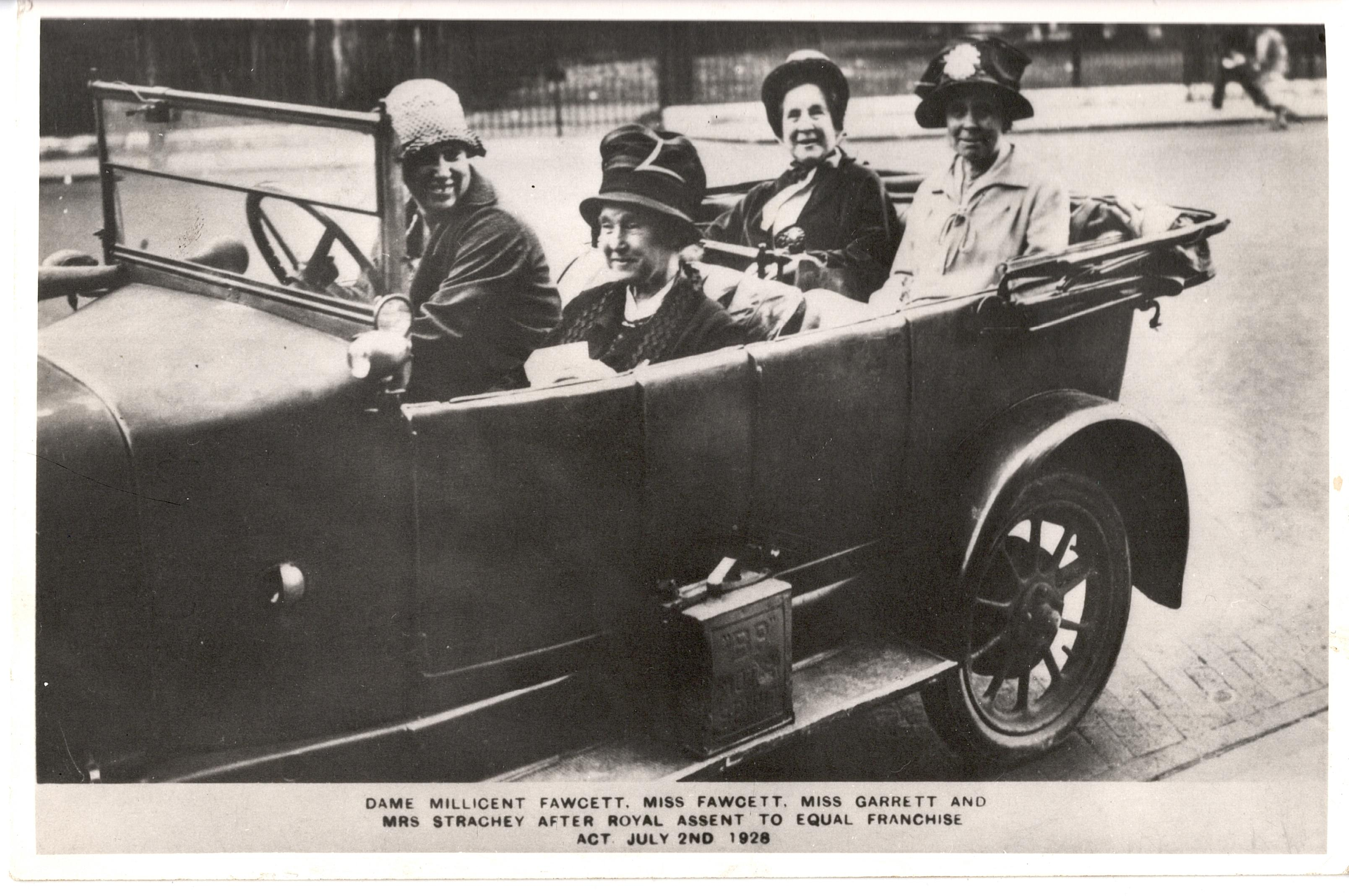
Millicent Fawcett, Agnes Garrett, Miss Fawcett and Ray Strachey after Royal Assent to the Equal Franchise Act in 1928

Agnes's older sister was Elizabeth Garrett Anderson, who was the first British woman to qualify as a doctor. Elizabeth set up a pioneering hospital for women, renamed after her death the Elizabeth Garrett Anderson Hospital, and Agnes contributed to its design. For example, she designed the fireplace for the entrance hall, which is now open to the public as a historical gallery within the refurbished UNISON headquarters building.

She was painted by the artist Annie Swynnerton in 1885. The painting survived and it was identified by the historian Elizabeth Crawford in the 2020s.

Her younger sister was the leading suffragist Millicent Fawcett. At Jacob Bright's suggestion it was decided to create a London-based organisation to lobby members of parliament concerning women's suffrage. The Central Committee of the National Society for Women's Suffrage first met on 17 January 1872. The first committee included Garrett, as well as Frances Power Cobbe, Priscilla Bright McLaren and Lilias Ashworth Hallett.

Garrett died in 1935.
