= William Garrett (businessman) =

British businessman and chemist

Sir William Herbert Garrett, MBE (13 March 1900 – 20 August 1977) was a British businessman and industrial chemist.

== Biography ==
Garrett was born on 13 March 1900 at Wrexham, the son of William Henry Garrett and his wife Mary Elizabeth, née Odgers. After Grove Park School, he attended the University of Liverpool, graduating in 1921 with a Bachelor of Science (BSc) degree and then completing a doctorate (PhD) in 1923.

In World War I, Garrett served in the Royal Flying Corps and then the Royal Air Force. In 1922, he joined Montanto Chemicals and remained there for nearly forty years. He was manager of its works at Ruabon before, in 1935, he was appointed to the Board and became Director of Production, a role which involved nurturing good industrial relations with employees at the firm. He also became interested in workplace safety and employer relations; becoming President of the British Safety Council and of the British Employers' Confederation (1958–60; in 1965 it formed the Confederation of British Industry). He was also Chairman of the Association of British Chemical Manufacturers (1959–61) and a member of the Civil Service Arbitration Tribunal (1960–65).

In the words of The Times, Garrett "held leading positions in industrial organisations where his knowledge and influence were always greatly valued", adding that he was also a "brilliant" industrial chemist. He was appointed a Member of the Order of the British Empire in 1944 and a Knight Bachelor in 1958.

Sir William Garrett died on 20 August 1977. In 1925, he had married Marion Birchall, younger daughter of Joseph Henry Houghton; before she died in 1967, they had a son and a daughter.
