= William B. Garrett III =

United States Army general (born 1963)

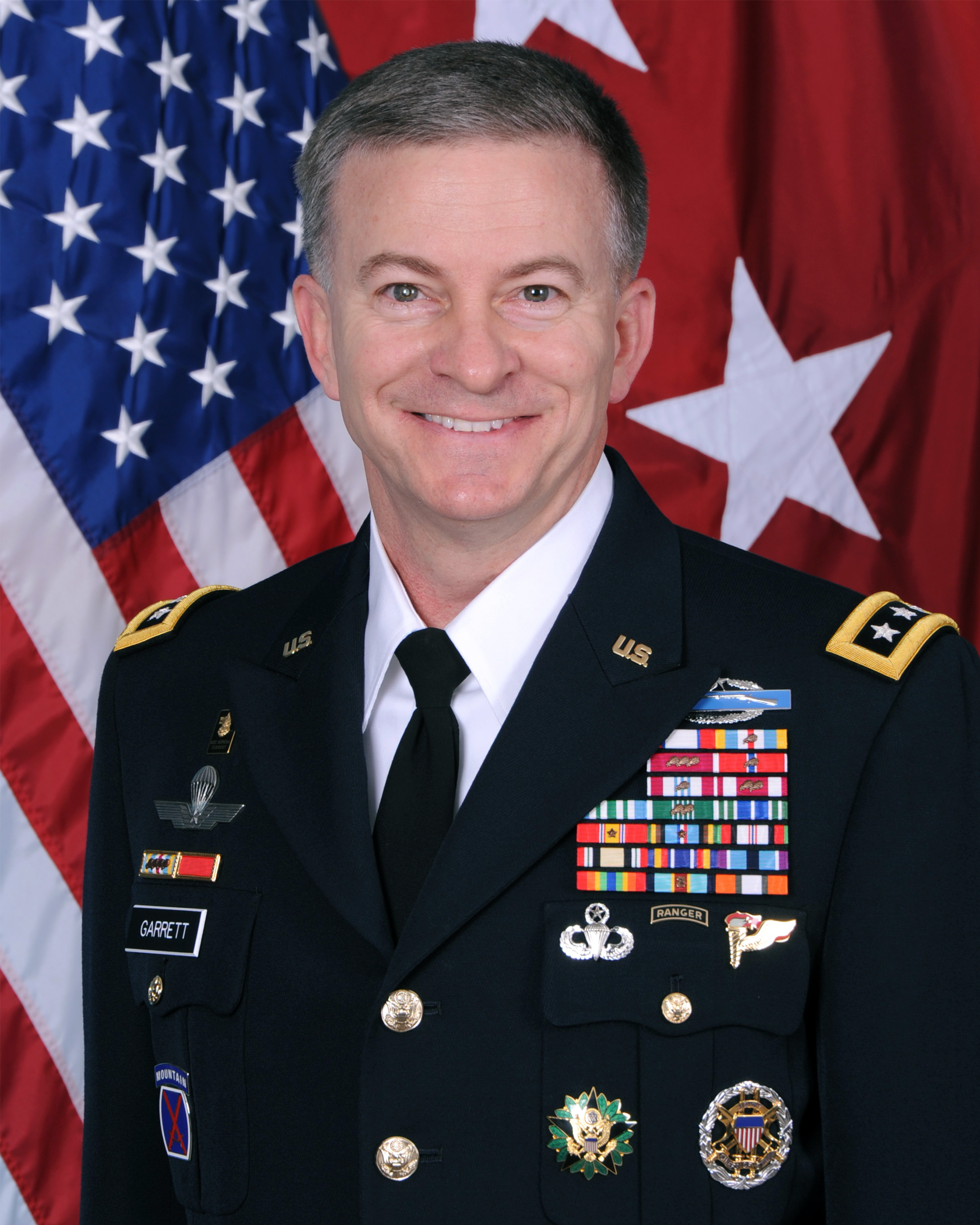
- Born: William B. Garrett III; February 19, 1953 (age 73); Jersey City, New Jersey, U.S.
- Military career
- Allegiance: United States
- Branch: US Army
- Service years: 1976-
- Rank: Lieutenant General
- Nickname: Burke
- Commands: United States Army Africa; 1st Brigade Combat Team, 78th Mountain Division; 1st Battalion, 27th Infantry Regiment
- Conflicts: War in Afghanistan; Iraq War
- Awards: Defense Distinguished Service Medal; Army Distinguished Service Medal (2); Defense Superior Service Medal (2); Legion of Merit (4); Bronze Star Medal (2)

William Burke Garrett III (born February 19, 1953) is an Active United States Army Lieutenant General.

== Military career ==
Garrett was commissioned in the United States Army as an infantry officer after graduating from North Georgia College in Dahlonega, Georgia in 1981. He graduated from the Infantry Officer Basic and Advanced Courses, the United States Army Command and General Staff College, the School of Advanced Military Studies, and the National War College. He holds a Master of Arts degree in management from Webster University, a Master of Arts degree in Military Art and Science from the U.S. Army Command and General Staff College, and a Master of Science degree in National Security and Strategic Studies from National Defense University. 7

Garrett became the Deputy Commander of the United States European Command on July 17, 2014. Before that, he served as Deputy Commanding General and Chief of Staff for United States Army Forces Command on December 31, 2012- in Fort Bragg. He was responsible for manning, equipping, and training 265,000 active component soldiers, and training and readiness oversight of 560,000 soldiers of the Army National Guard and the United States Army Reserve. Garrett also served as Chief of Staff, United States Forces Iraq, and as Commanding General, United States Army Africa and United States Army Southern European Task Force, Vicenza, Italy.

Other assignments include tours of duty with the 6th Infantry Division, 10th Mountain Division, 25th Infantry Division, 82nd Airborne Division, XVIII Airborne Corps, United States Army Combined Arms Center, the United States Special Operations Command, the Army Staff, and the Joint Staff. He has served operational tours in Grenada, Egypt, Syria, and Afghanistan. He served on the board of advisors of the Military Cyber Professionals Association.

== Awards and decorations ==
LTG Garrett has received the following awards:

Personal decorations
	Defense Distinguished Service Medal
	Army Distinguished Service Medal (with 1 oak leaf cluster)
	Defense Superior Service Medal (with 1 oak leaf cluster)
	Legion of Merit (with 3 oak leaf clusters)
	Bronze Star (with 1 oak leaf cluster)
	Defense Meritorious Service Medal (with 1 oak leaf cluster)
	Meritorious Service Medal (with 2 oak leaf clusters)
	Joint Service Commendation Medal
	Army Commendation Medal (with 2 oak leaf clusters)
Width-44 ribbon with two width-9 ultramarine blue stripes surrounded by two pairs of two width-4 green stripes; all these stripes are separated by width-2 white borders	Army Achievement Medal
Unit Awards
	Joint Meritorious Unit Award (with 4 oak leaf clusters)
	Meritorious Unit Commendation
Campaign and service medals
	National Defense Service Medal (with 1 Service star)
	Armed Forces Expeditionary Medal (with 1 Campaign star)
	Afghanistan Campaign Medal
	Iraq Campaign Medal
	Global War on Terrorism Expeditionary Medal
	Global War on Terrorism Service Medal
	Humanitarian Service Medal
Service and training awards
	Army Service Ribbon
	Overseas Service Ribbon (with award numeral 3)
Foreign awards
	Multinational Force and Observers Medal

Other accoutrements
Combat Infantryman Badge with star (denoting second award)
Expert Infantryman Badge
Master Parachutist Badge
Pathfinder Badge
Italian Military Parachutist Badge
Ranger Tab
10th Mountain Division Combat Service Identification Badge
Army Staff Identification Badge
Joint Chiefs of Staff Identification Badge
27th Infantry Regiment Distinctive Unit Insignia
