= William Garrett (cricketer) =

English cricketer (1876–1953)

Personal information
- Full name: William Thomas Garrett
- Born: 9 January 1876; Camberwell, Surrey, England
- Died: 16 February 1953 (aged 77); Buckhurst Hill, Essex, England
- Batting: Right-handed
- Role: Batsman

Domestic team information
- Years: Team
- 1900–1903: Essex
- FC debut: 19 July 1900 Essex v Hampshire
- Last FC: 18 June 1903 Essex v Warwickshire

Career statistics
Competition	First-class
Matches	15
Runs scored	516
Batting average	21.50
100s/50s	0/3
Top score	92
Balls bowled	264
Wickets	1
Bowling average	142.00
5 wickets in innings	0
10 wickets in match	0
Best bowling	1/72
Catches/stumpings	4/–
- Source: Cricinfo, 23 July 2013

William Thomas Garrett (9 January 1876 – 16 February 1953) was an English cricketer. He played first-class cricket for Essex County Cricket Club between 1900 and 1903.

Garrett played in 16 first-class matches for Essex, with his most notable performances against Warwickshire. In a 1900 Leyton match, he batted for nearly four hours to save the game with 64 not out after Essex had to follow on 394 runs behind Warwickshire. The subsequent season saw him score 92 at Edgbaston―his highest first-class score―and 76 in the return match at Leyton.

In his first-class career Garrett scored a total of 516 runs and took a single wicket. He played for Surrey's Second XI during 1904 and 1905. He worked as a licensee and died at Buckhurst Hill near Loughton in 1953 aged 76.
