= George Garrett (broadcaster) =

Canadian journalist (1934–2024)

- Born: November 16, 1934
- Died: 18 March 2024 (aged 89)
- Occupation: Journalist
- Years active: 1950s–1990s
- Spouse: Joan McIntyre
- Children: 3

George Garrett (16 November 1934 – 18 March 2024) was a Canadian broadcast journalist who was widely recognized as a prominent voice in news radio. He worked for CKNW in Vancouver, British Columbia, and covered the 1992 Los Angeles riots. During the riots, he was beaten by multiple rioters before being taken to the hospital by two bystanders. The incident broke two bones and caused the loss of a front tooth. He was the recipient of the Jack Webster Foundation's Bruce Hutchison Lifetime Achievement Award at the 1996 Jack Webster awards. He retired in 1999 after having been with the station for 43 years. Born on 16 November 1934, Garrett died on 18 March 2024, at the age of 89. In 2022, he had disclosed a diagnosis of squamous cell carcinoma of the skin.

In 2019, Garrett published a memoir called George Garret: Intrepid Reporter, which featured stories from throughout his five decade career and childhood. The nickname "Intrepid Reporter" was given to him by Rafe Mair, another long-time broadcasting legend.
