= George Garrett (composer) =

English organist and composer

George Mursell Garrett (8 June 1834 – 8 April 1897) was an English organist and composer.

Garrett was born in Winchester where his father was master of the choristers at Winchester Cathedral. He later served as assistant to Samuel Sebastian Wesley at Winchester. Garrett was appointed the Director of Music at St. John's College, Cambridge in 1857 and held the position for forty years.

Garrett wrote music for the Anglican Church in the form of service settings and anthems. He is perhaps best represented today by his Anglican chant setting of Psalm 126.

He is buried in the Mill Road cemetery, Cambridge.

Preceded by Thomas Attwood Walmisley	Director of Music, St John's College, Cambridge; 1857–1897	Succeeded by Cyril Rootham
