= List of people from Belfast =

Coordinates: 54.59266°N 5.91790°W

This is a list of notable people born, raised or resident in Belfast, Northern Ireland.

== Arts ==
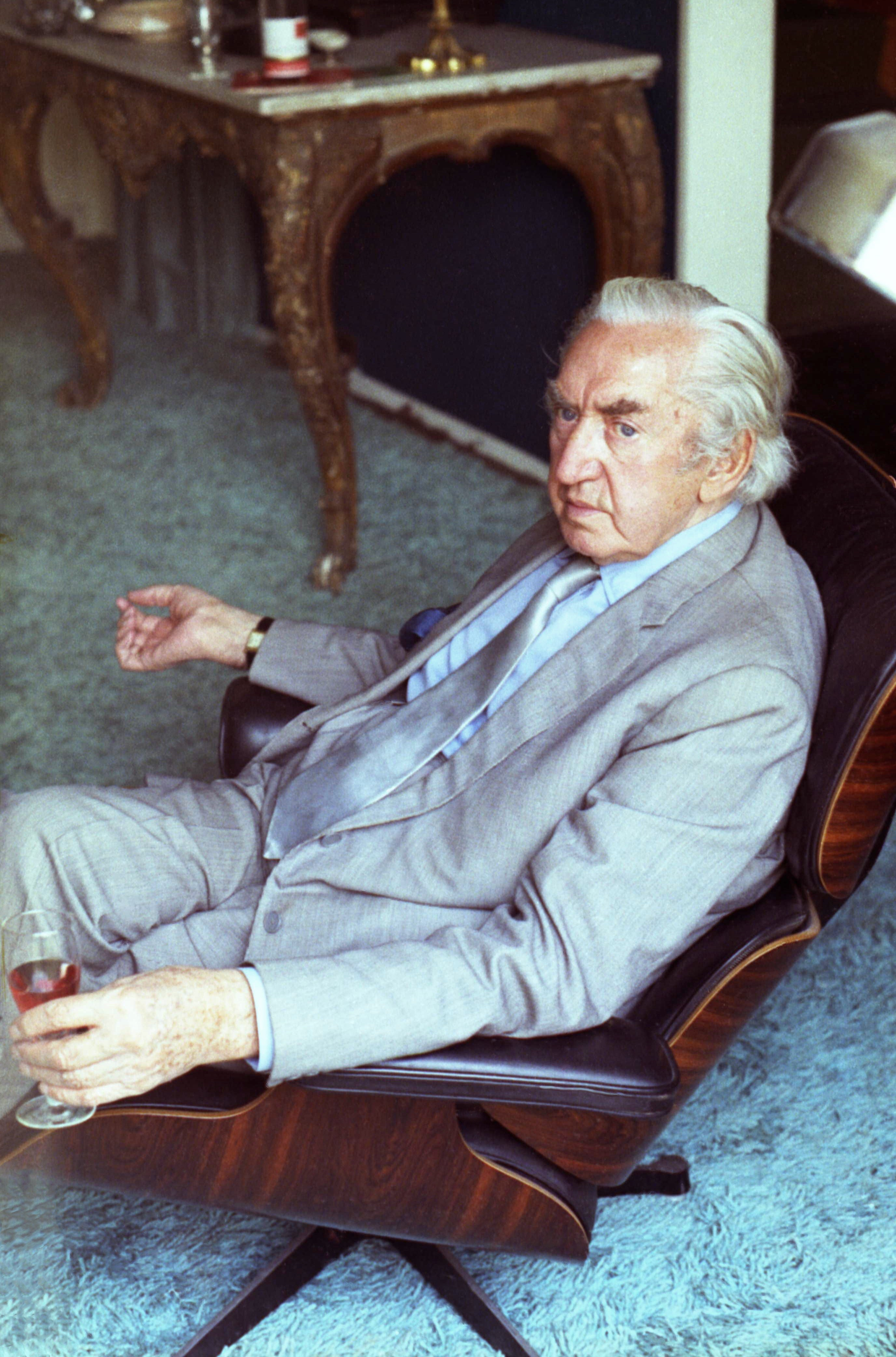
Brian Desmond Hurst in 1976 (portrait by Allan Warren)

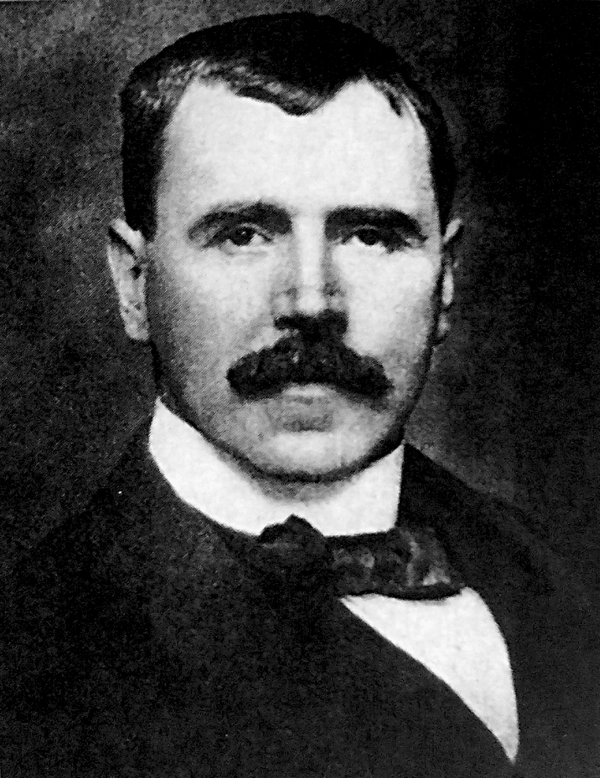
John Lavery

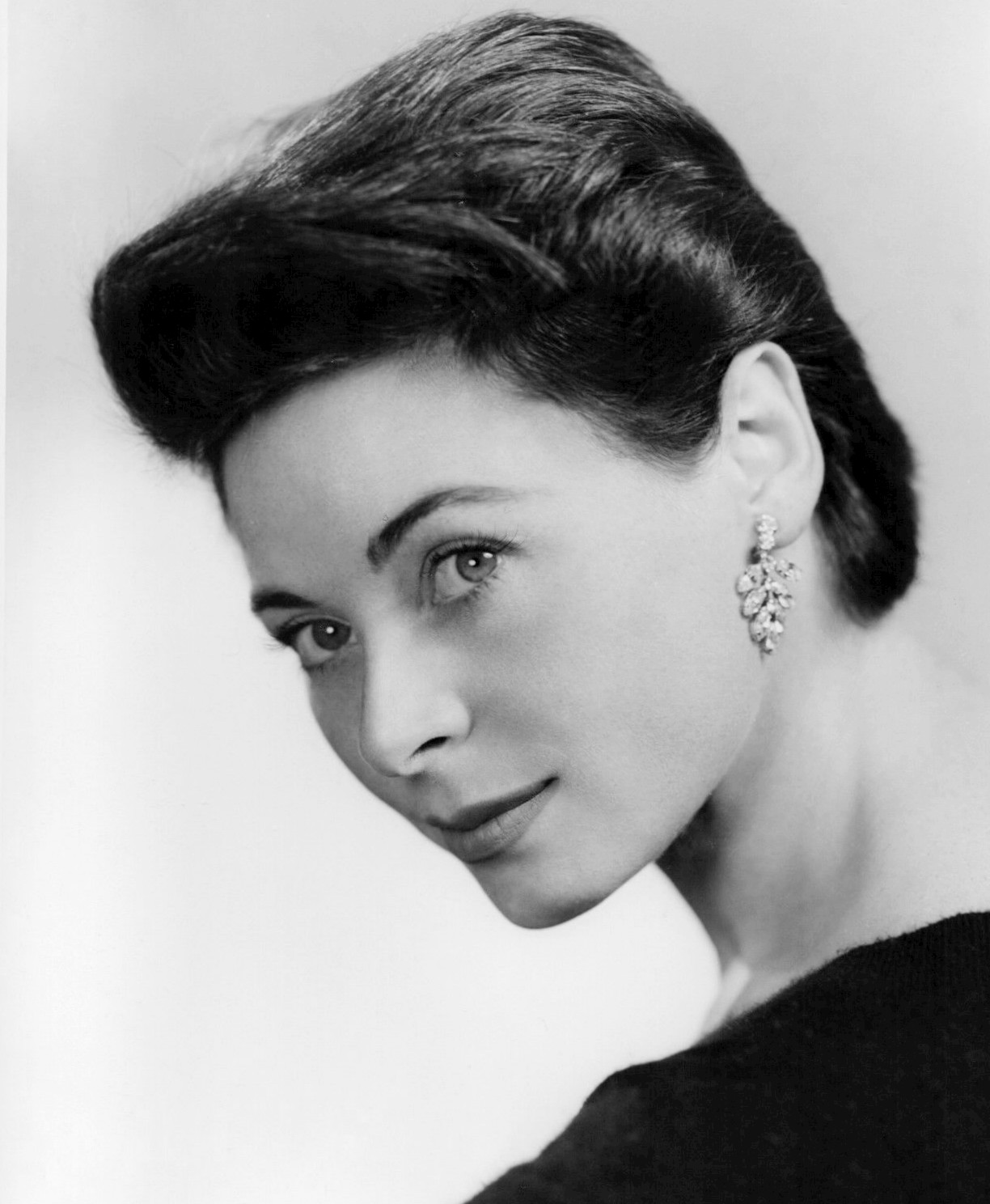
Siobhan McKenna

- Derek Bell (1935–2002), harpist and composer
- Eric Bell (born 1947), guitarist; former member of Them and Thin Lizzy
- James Bingham (1925–2009), artist
- Doris Blair (1915–2011), artist
- Kenneth Branagh (born 1960), actor and director
- Jake Burns (born 1958), musician (Stiff Little Fingers)
- Vivian Campbell (born 1962), musician (Dio, Def Leppard)
- Ciaran Carson (1948–2019), poet and novelist
- George Cassidy (1936–2023), musician
- Catoan, band
- Nathan Connolly (born 1981), musician (Snow Patrol)
- Mairtín Crawford (1967–2004), poet
- Gerald Dawe (born 1952), poet
- Gerald Dillon (1916–1971), artist
- Laura Donnelly (born 1982), actress
- Jamie Dornan (born 1982), actor
- Barry Douglas (born 1960), concert pianist
- Garth Ennis (born 1970), comics writer
- Padraic Fiacc (1924–2019), poet
- Olga Fielden (1903–1973), playwright and novelist
- James Galway (born 1939), musician
- Joe Graham (1944–2021), writer and historian
- Stuart Graham (born 1967), actor
- Ceara Grehan, theatre and opera singer
- Karen Hassan (born 1981), actress
- Kaz Hawkins (born 1973), musician
- Hector Heathwood (born 1957), photographer of erotica, fetish and burlesque
- Paul Henry (1876–1958), painter
- John Hewitt (1907–1987), poet
- Ciarán Hinds (born 1953), actor
- P.J. Holden (born 1969), comic artist
- David Holmes (born 1969), DJ
- Brian Desmond Hurst (1895–1986), film director
- Oliver Jeffers (born 1977), artist
- Brian Keenan (born 1950), hostage and writer
- Ian Knox (born 1943) comic artist and political cartoonist
- Sam Kydd (1915–1982), actor
- Ben Kyle (born 1981), musician, leader of Romantica
- Sir John Lavery (1856–1941), artist
- C.S. Lewis (1898–1963), author and scholar
- Michael Longley (born 1939), poet
- Ian Masterson, musician
- Paul Masterson, music producer
- Gerry McAvoy (born 1951), musician
- Christopher McCafferty, DJ, club promoter
- Gerard McCarthy (born 1981), actor and television presenter
- John McCrea (born 1966), comic artist
- Ian McDonald (born 1960), science fiction author
- Siobhán McKenna (1922–1986), actress
- Ali McMordie (born 1959), musician (Stiff Little Fingers)
- Katie Melua (born 1984), musician
- Seaneen Molloy, blogger and columnist
- Brian Moore (1921–1999), novelist
- Gary Moore (1952–2011), musician, blues and rock guitarist formerly of Thin Lizzy
- Van Morrison (born 1945), musician
- Clara Mulholland (1849–1934), writer
- Ruby Murray (1935–1996), singer/actress
- Doc Neeson (1947–2014), musician
- Una O'Connor (1880–1959), actress
- Jonjo O'Neill (born 1952), actor
- Patricia Quinn (born 1944), actress in The Rocky Horror Picture Show
- Stephen Rea (born 1946), actor
- Bob Shaw (1931–1996), science fiction author
- Duke Special (born 1971), musician
- Bronágh Taggart, actress
- Austin Trevor (1897–1978), actor
- Rachel Tucker (born 1981), actress (West End)
- And So I Watch You From Afar (formed 2005) instrumental math rock band

== Business ==
- Thomas Andrews, shipbuilder
- Andrew Mulholland, flax manufacturer
- William Pirrie, 1st Viscount Pirrie, shipbuilder and politician
- Frank Carson, comedian
- Nauheed Cyrusi, actress, model, VJ
- Mary Gormley, beauty queen (Miss Universe Ireland 2000)
- John Kelly, coal merchant, shipowner
- Sir Samuel Kelly, coal merchant, shipowner
- Mickey Marley, street entertainer
- Declan Mulholland, actor
- Ruby Murray, singer
- Holly Quin-Ankrah, actress
- Roy Walker, comedian
- Adrian Zagoritis, songwriter

== Law ==
- R. J. McMordie, Irish barrister, politician, and Lord Mayor of Belfast
- Professor Denis Moloney, solicitor

== Media ==
- Gerry Anderson (1944–2014), radio and TV presenter; born and raised in Derry
- Christine Bleakley (born 1979), TV presenter; born in Newry; grew up in Newtownards
- Andrea Catherwood (born 1967), newsreader; born and raised in Belfast
- Eamonn Holmes (born 1959), television presenter; born and raised in Belfast
- John Irvine, broadcast journalist; born and raised in Belfast
- Shauna Lowry (born 1970), television presenter; born and raised in Belfast
- Abeer Macintyre (born 1964), television and radio presenter; born in Amman and moved to Belfast in 1969
- Lyra McKee (1990–2019), journalist; born and raised in Belfast
- Colin Murray (born 1977), radio DJ and journalist; born and raised in Belfast
- Denis Murray (born 1951), broadcast journalist; born in Worcestershire and raised in Belfast
- Bill Neely (born 1959), broadcast journalist; born and raised in Belfast
- Stephen Nolan (born 1973), radio and TV presenter DJ; born and raised in Belfast
- Julian Simmons (born 1952), UTV, TV presenter and public figure; born in Kent and raised in Belfast
- Fionnuala Sweeney, CNN presenter and reporter; born and raised in Belfast

== Military ==
- Bryan Budd, soldier and posthumous Victoria Cross recipient
- Patrick Carlin, Victoria Cross recipient
- Colonel Tim Collins, former commander, Royal Irish Regiment, British Army
- James Joseph Magennis, submariner and Victoria Cross recipient
- William Frederick McFadzean, soldier and posthumous Victoria Cross recipient

== Politics ==
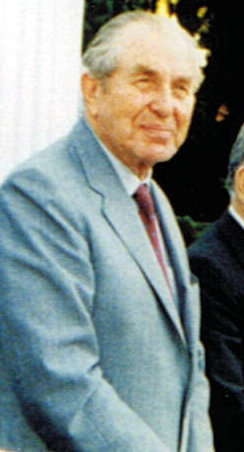
Chaim Herzog

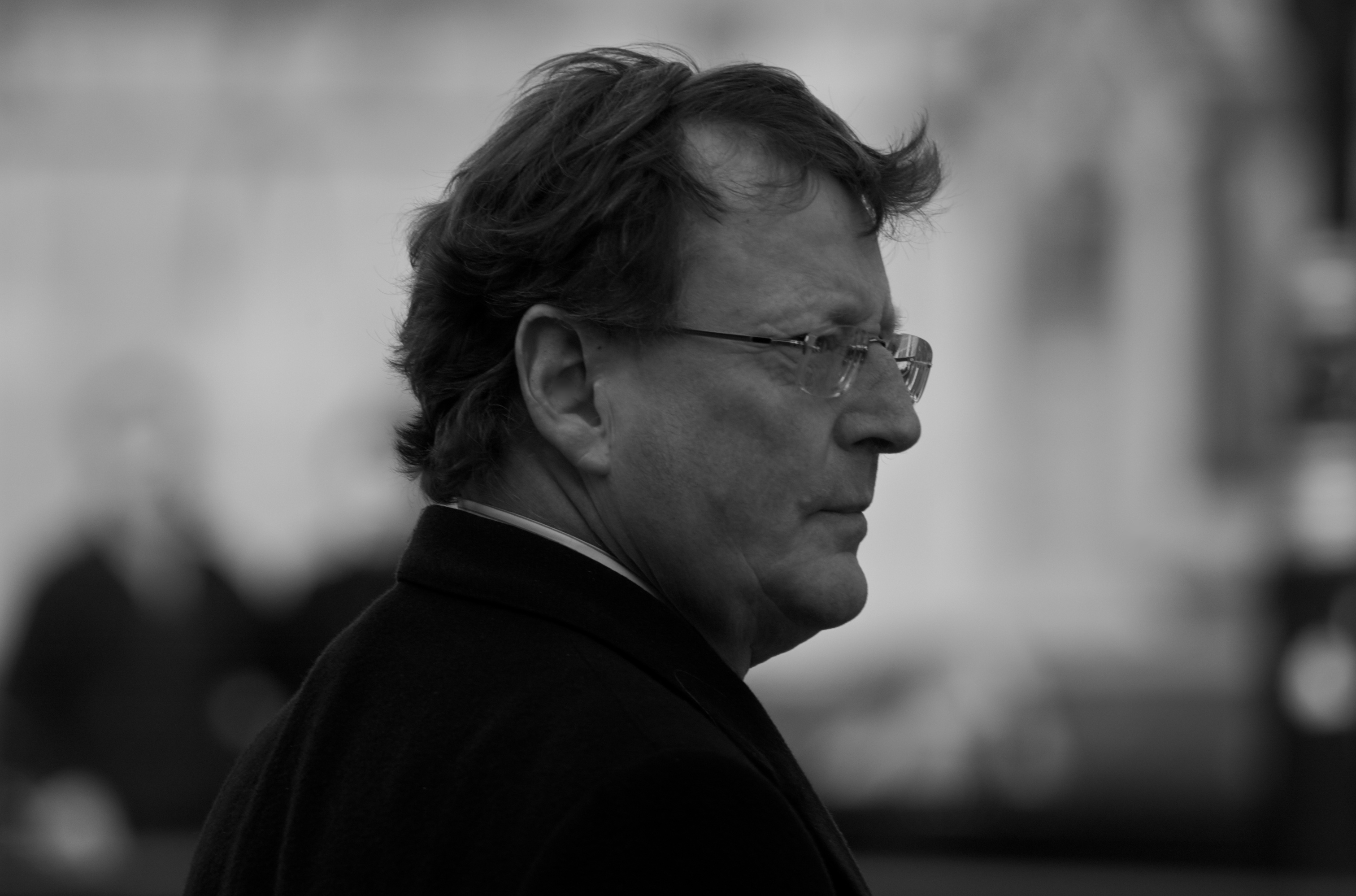
David Trimble

- Gerry Adams (born 1948), republican political leader
- Lily Anderson (1922–1982), social campaigner and communist
- Paddy Ashdown (1941–2018), former leader of the Liberal Democrats; born in New Delhi, brought up near Comber
- Tony Banks (1942–2006), later Lord Stratford, politician; born in Befast, grew up in London
- Sarah "Venie" Barr, political and community activist
- May Blood, Baroness Blood (1938–2022), Labour member of the House of Lords
- Robert Bradford (1941–1981), assassinated unionist politician; born in Limavady
- Sir William Cairns (1826–1886), colonial administrator and Governor of Queensland, Australia
- Mairead Corrigan (born 1944), Nobel Laureate (Peace)
- James Craig, 1st Viscount Craigavon (1871–1940), Prime Minister of Northern Ireland
- Reg Empey (born 1947), unionist political leader
- Frank Gault (1826–1896), member of the Wisconsin State Assembly
- Gerry Fitt (1926–2005), later Lord Fitt, nationalist political leader
- Chaim Herzog (1918–1997), sixth President of Israel
- Mary McAleese (born 1951), eighth President of Ireland
- David McCalden (1951–1990), far-right activist and AIDS victim
- Arlene McCarthy (born 1960), politician; Member of the European Parliament for North West England for the Labour Party from 1994 to 2014
- Henry Joy McCracken (1765–1798), leading member of the Society of the United Irishmen
- Adam McGibbon (born 1988), environmentalist and writer
- Julia McMordie (1860–1942), Ulster Unionist Party politician; first female High Sheriff of Belfast; born in Hartlepool
- Peter Robinson (born 1948), unionist political leader and First Minister of Northern Ireland
- Bobby Sands (1954–1981), anti H-Block MP for Fermanagh and South Tyrone; hunger striker
- David Trimble (1944–2022), Nobel Peace Prize winner; first First Minister of Northern Ireland
- Betty Williams (1943–2020), Nobel Laureate (Peace)

== Religious ==
- William Conway (1913–1977), Roman Catholic Archbishop of Armagh
- Henry Cooke (1788–1868), Presbyterian minister
- Robin Eames (born 1936), Church of Ireland Archbishop of Armagh

== Science ==
- Thomas Andrews (1813–1885), chemist and physicist
- Isobel Agnes Arbuthnot (1870–1963), botanist and botanical collector based in South Africa
- John Stewart Bell (1928–1990), physicist
- Jocelyn Bell Burnell (born 1943), astronomer (discoverer of pulsars); born in Lurgan
- Sidney Elisabeth Croskery (1901–1990), doctor; born in Gortgranagh, Killinure, County Tyrone
- John Boyd Dunlop (1840–1921), inventor and veterinary surgeon; born in Dreghorn, North Ayrshire, and studied to be a veterinary surgeon at the Dick Vet, University of Edinburgh, moving to Downpatrick, Ireland in 1867
- George Crawford Hyndman (1796–1867), biologist
- Charles Lanyon (1813–1889), architect; born in Eastbourne, Sussex; moved to Antrim in 1836 to become county surveyor until 1860; elected Mayor of Belfast in 1862
- William Lewis (1885–1956), Professor of Physical Chemistry, Liverpool; propounded collision theory
- Samuel Martin Stephenson (1742–1833), prominent Belfast doctor who founded a hospital, the medical society and medical school
- William Thomson, 1st Baron Kelvin (1824–1907), mathematical physicist, engineer, and leader in the physical sciences of the 19th century

== Sport ==
- Tom Armstrong, football player
- George Best, football player
- Billy Bingham, football player and manager
- Danny Blanchflower, football player
- William Clay, football player
- Sammy Clingan, pro footballer
- Ray Close, boxer
- David Cullen, basketball player and 2007 winner of the Arthur Ashe for Courage Award at the ESPY awards for work with Peace Players International
- Joey Dunlop, international motorcycle champion
- Dave Finlay, professional wrestler
- Johnny Flynn, football player
- John Graham, NASCAR driver
- David Healy, football player
- Alex Higgins, former world snooker champion
- Eddie Irvine, Formula One driver
- Damaen Kelly, former professional boxer and Olympic bronze medalist
- Jim Magilton, football player and manager
- Wayne McCullough, former world champion boxer and Olympic medalist
- Alexander McDonnell, early 19th-century chess master
- Sammy McIlroy, football player
- Eric McMordie, football player
- Rinty Monaghan, former undisputed world flyweight boxing champion
- Alanna Nihell, boxer
- Owen Nolan, Ice hockey player
- Andrew Patterson, cricketer
- Mark Patterson, cricketer
- Mary Peters, athlete and Olympic gold medalist
- Paul Stirling, cricketer
- Tucker, professional wrestler
- John Watson, Formula One driver
- Norman Whiteside, football player

== Other ==
- John Bodkin Adams (1899–1982), doctor and suspected serial killer; born and raised in Randalstown; attended Queen's University Belfast; obtained post as general practitioner in Eastbourne in 1922
- Hamish Kippen (1987–2008), Canadian fashion photographer and former junior athlete; born in Belfast, emigrated with family to Toronto in 1989
- Alexander Robinson (c. 1901–1995), boxer and loyalist paramilitary; born and lived in Belfast
- Amanda Teague, Irish pirate impersonator and posthumous marrier.
