= Harry Hall (botanist) =

Botanist (1906-1986)

- Born: 22 May 1906; Macclesfield, Cheshire
- Died: 15 February 1986 (aged 79); Kirstenbosch
- Education: Cheshire Agricultural College; Reading University; John Innes Horticultural Institute
- Known for: Succulent plants
- Scientific career
- Fields: Botanist
- Workplaces: Kirstenbosch National Botanical Garden
- Author abbrev. (botany): Harry Hall

Harry Hall (22 May 1906 Macclesfield, Cheshire – 15 February 1986 Kirstenbosch), was a British-born horticulturist, botanist and succulent plant authority.

== Early life and education ==
Hall attended Cheshire Agricultural College for one year (1925–26), Reading University in (1926–27) and two years at the John Innes Horticultural Institute in Wimbledon (1927–29). He then enrolled for a further three-year course (1930–1933) at the Royal Botanic Gardens, Kew, followed by being an exchange student for one year (1931–1932) at the Hanbury Botanical Garden in La Mortola in Italy. Here his passion for succulent plants was ignited, and on his return to Kew headed the section dealing with the cactus and succulent collection.

== Career ==
Hall's training at Kew was complete by 1933, whereupon he became curator of the succulent plant collection at Alexandra Park, Manchester. His consuming interest in South African succulents led to some 600 species being added to the collection. During WWII he spent four years with the Royal Air Force, at the end of which he contacted Robert Harold Compton, director of Kirstenbosch in South Africa, inquiring about the possibility of a position there. A post was created especially, and Hall arrived with his wife and 12-year-old son in August 1947. Starting with a very small succulent plant collection, Hall improved its stature to one of world renown by the time of his death.

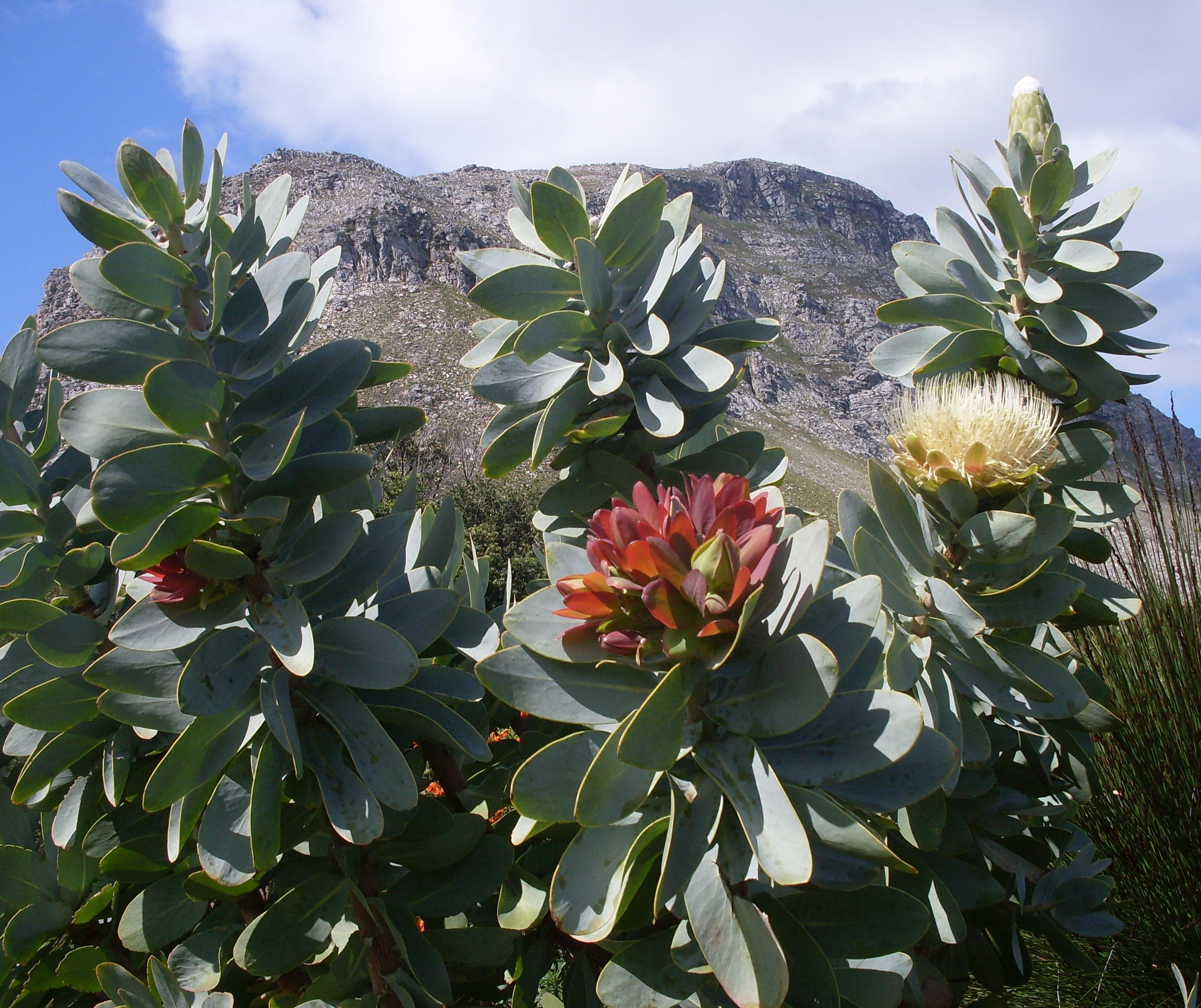
"Waboom protea" (Protea nitida) in the Kogelberg mountains

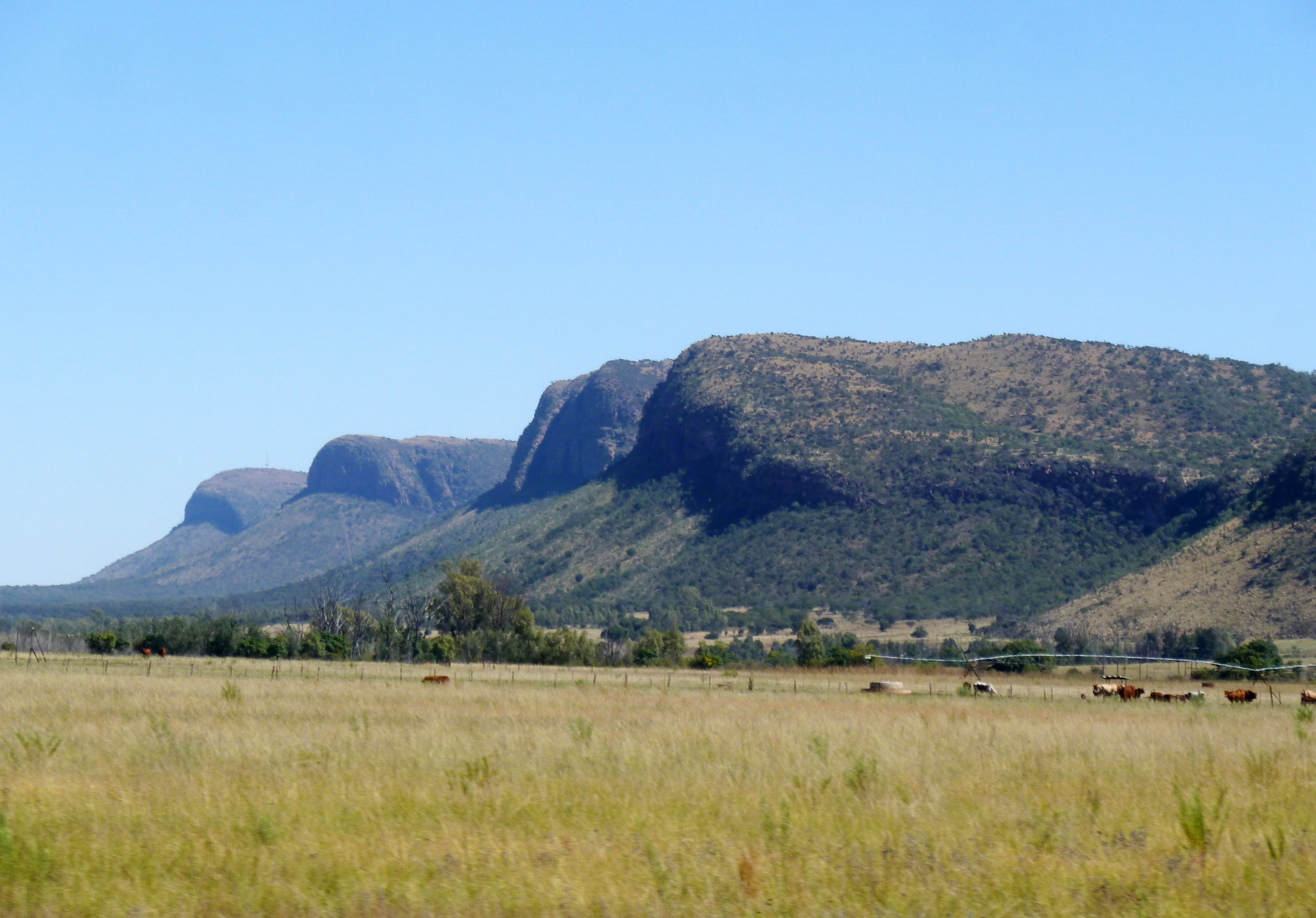
Sandrivier range of the central Waterberg, 15 km south of Vaalwater

He organised some 140 exploration and collecting trips throughout southern Africa, often accompanied by fellow collectors. Compton from Kirstenbosch, Reynolds the Aloe authority, Bernard Carp, nurseryman and patron for some collecting trips, Ted Schelpe, professor and curator of Bolus Herbarium at University of Cape Town, Leonard Eric Newton, from Kumasi University in Ghana, and Gordon Douglas Rowley, horticulture and botany lecturer and author from Reading University. His travels took him through Kogelberg Nature Reserve, during which time he stayed in Gordon's Bay. He also travelled through what is Addo Elephant National Park, examining the flora, as well as Camdeboo National Park, Augrabies Falls and the Waterberg Biosphere.

He was competent with both pencil and camera, illustrating his numerous contributions to the 'National Cactus and Succulent Journal' and other journals. He produced a small Longman's field guide 'Common Succulents' in 1955 illustrated by Elsie Garrett Rice, and collaborated with Harriet Margaret Louisa Bolus (1877–1970) on the Mesembryanthemaceae.

Harry Hall's second marriage was to Lisabel Irene Booysen, a fellow botanist who had graduated from the University of Pretoria. She had worked for the CSIR, been employed by the University of Pretoria in their Department of Plant Physiology and had been a school teacher before moving to Cape Town and Kirstenbosch, where she met Harry.

He became a member of the 'International Organization for Succulent Plant Study' in 1953, and received the 'Cactus and Succulent Society of America' Fellow award in 1981. He is commemorated in the genus Hallianthus, and in numerous succulent specific names.

The standard author abbreviation Harry Hall is used to indicate this person as the author when citing a botanical name.

== Associates ==
- Bernard Carp (1908–1966)
- Robert Harold Compton (1886–1979)
- Lisabel Irene Hall (1919–2008) (co-collector, wife)
- Leonard Eric Newton (1936-) (co-collector)
- Gilbert Westacott Reynolds (1895–1967) (co-collector)
- Gordon Douglas Rowley (1921–2019) (co-collector)
- Edmund André Charles Louis Eloi Schelpe (1924–1985) (co-collector)
