= Leatherbarrow =

Leatherbarrow is an English surname. Notable people with the surname include:

- Alison Leatherbarrow, English former footballer
- Bert Leatherbarrow (1909–1983), New Zealand rugby league player
- Bob Leatherbarrow (born 1955), American jazz composer, jazz drummer and vibraphonist
- Charlie Leatherbarrow (1870–1940), English footballer
- David Leatherbarrow, American architecture writer
- Linda Leatherbarrow, Scottish writer and illustrator
- Scott Leatherbarrow (born 1990), English rugby league player
