= Louisa Bolus =

South African botanist (1877–1970)

Harriet Margaret Louisa Bolus FRSSAf
- Born: 31 July 1877; Burgersdorp, Cape Province, South Africa
- Died: 5 April 1970 (aged 92); Cape Town
- Education: Collegiate Girls High School, Port Elizabeth
- Alma mater: South African College (B.A.)
- Awards: Fellow of the Royal Society of South Africa
- Scientific career
- Fields: Botany
- Institutions: Bolus Herbarium
- Author abbrev. (botany): Kensit; L.Bolus

Harriet Margaret Louisa Bolus née Kensit (31 July 1877 in Burgersdorp – 5 April 1970 in Cape Town) was a South African botanist and taxonomist, and the longtime curator of the Bolus Herbarium, from 1903. Bolus also has the legacy of authoring more land plant species than any other female scientist, in total naming 1,494 species.

== Early life and education ==
Bolus was born in Burgersdorp, Cape Province, South Africa, on 31 July 1877. She was the daughter of William Kensit and Jane Stuart Kensit. Her parents were both British-born. Her grandfather William Kensit was a serious amateur botanist and specimen collector in South Africa. She attended Collegiate Girls' High School in Port Elizabeth, earned a teaching credential in 1899, and was awarded a BA degree in literature and philosophy by the University of the Cape of Good Hope in 1902.

== Career ==
She worked as an assistant to her great-aunt Sophia's husband Harry Bolus in his herbarium while she was in college. In June 1913 she became a founding member of the council of the Botanical Society of South Africa; she was also a founding member of the Wild Life Protection Society, and a fellow of the Royal Society of South Africa, the Linnean Society, and the Southern Africa Association for the Advancement of Science. She was appointed curator of the Bolus Herbarium in 1903, and retired from that position in 1955. She hired botanical artist Louise Guthrie as a staff member at the herbarium.

Her first book, Elementary Lessons in Systematic Botany, was published in 1919. This was followed by two volumes of books on South African flowers. Louisa contributed to a number of botanical journals throughout her life, and edited the Annals of the Bolus Herbarium.

Louisa Bolus spent much of her life doing in-depth research on Mesembryanthemum. Her Notes on Mesembryanthemum and Allied Genera was published in 1927. This was followed by the publication of three books, covering the detailed Latin descriptions of approximately 1500 plants. In 1936 Louisa was awarded an honorary Doctorate of Science degree from the University of Stellenbosch.

A plant belonging to the large family Mesembreyanthemum, genus Kensitia was established to honour Bolus's work on the subject. Louisa Bolus made contributions to Flowering Plants of South Africa, edited by E. P. Phillips in 1943, and in 1951 she was a guarantor for the publication of Wild Flowers of the Cape of Good Hope by Elsie Garrett Rice and R. H. Compton. Bolus was also considered a pioneer of the nature study classes at the Kirstenbosch National Botanical Garden. In 1966, she became vice president of the African Succulent Plant Society.

Bolus studied the flora of the area around the Cape of Good Hope, especially Ericaceae and Orchidaceae. She frequently published in botanical journals in addition to popular gardening articles and books, notably A Book of South African Flora. She was elected a Fellow of the Royal Society of South Africa in 1920 and received an honorary doctorate from Stellenbosch University. The genus Bolusanthus and the species Geissorhiza louisabolusiae are named in her honour.

== Personal life ==
In 1912 Louisa Kensit married Harry Bolus's son (and her father's cousin) Frank Bolus. She was widowed when Frank Bolus died in 1945. Louisa Bolus died at her home in Claremont, Cape Town in 1970 at the age of 93.

== Works ==
- Annals of the Bolus Herbarium. University Press. 1914.
- Elementary Lessons in Systematic Botany. Cape Town. 1919.
- Notes on Mesembryanthemum and Allied Genera. University of Cape Town. 1927.
- A Book of South African Flowers. Juta. 1928.
- A Second Book of South African Flowers. Specialty Press of South Africa. 1936.

== See also ==
- Category:Taxa named by Louisa Bolus
- Timeline of women in science
