= Samuel Stephenson =

Samuel Stephenson may refer to:

- Samuel M. Stephenson, American politician from Michigan
- Samuel Martin Stephenson, Irish Presbyterian minister and physician.
- Sam Stephenson, Irish architect
