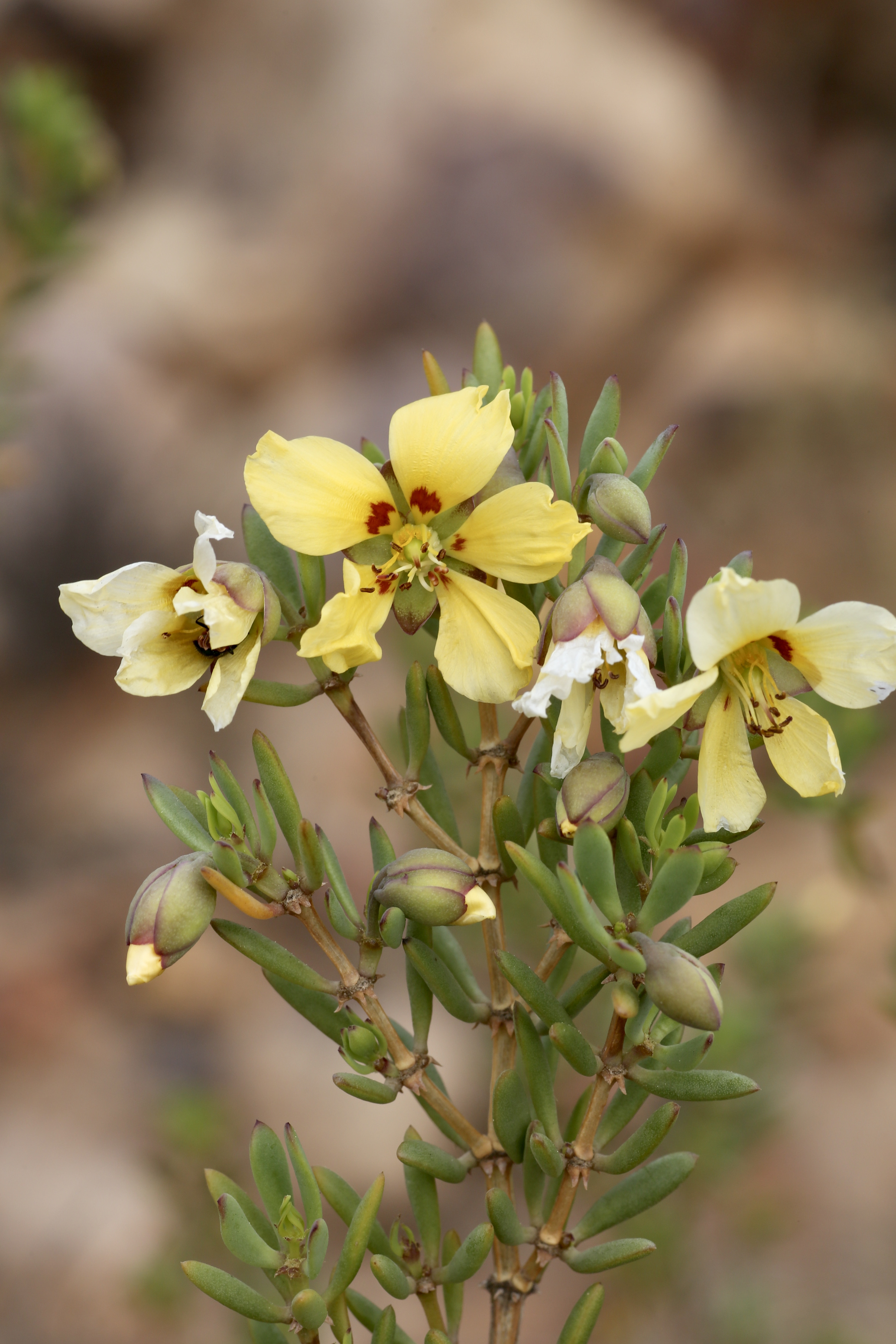
- Roepera fulva in Rooiberg Nature Reserve, South Africa.

Scientific classification
- Kingdom: Plantae
- Clade: Tracheophytes
- Clade: Angiosperms
- Clade: Eudicots
- Clade: Rosids
- Order: Zygophyllales
- Family: Zygophyllaceae
- Subfamily: Zygophylloideae
- Genus: Roepera; A.Juss.

= Roepera =

Genus of flowering plants

Roepera is a genus of flowering plants in the family Zygophyllaceae, subfamily Zygophylloideae. It is native to Australia and south-western Africa, from Angola to South Africa.

== Description ==
Species of Roepera are shrubs, subshrubs or herbaceous plants. The shrubby species may be up to 3 m (10 ft) tall. The leaves are opposite, with or without petioles, and have one or two leaflets. The flowers have four or five sepals, which persist in the fruit, and four or five petals of various colours. The eight to ten stamens usually have undivided appendages. The ovary has four or five locules (chambers). The fruit is usually a capsule, or more rarely a winged schizocarp. The seeds are mucilaginous and have a more-or-less well developed aril.

== Taxonomy ==
The genus Roepera was first published by Adrien-Henri de Jussieu in 1825, for two Australian species of Zygophyllum. However, de Jussieu did not actually publish the two new combinations, Roepera billardierei and Roepera fruticulosa. These were published by George Don in 1831. The genus was rarely used until the 21st century, the two species being kept in Zygophyllum. Molecular phylogenetic studies in 2000 and 2003 showed that the genus Zygophyllum, as then circumscribed, was polyphyletic. In 2003, Beier et al. resurrected Roepera as part of revising Zygophyllum to make it monophyletic. About 60 former Zygophyllum species were placed in Roepera. The genus is placed in subfamily Zygophylloideae.

=== Species ===
As of January 2018, Plants of the World Online recognized 60 species:

- Roepera ammophila (F.Muell.) Beier & Thulin
- Roepera angustifolia (H.Eichler) Beier & Thulin
- Roepera apiculata (F.Muell.) Beier & Thulin
- Roepera aurantiaca Lindl.
- Roepera billardierei (DC.) G.Don
- Roepera botulifolia (Van Zyl) Beier & Thulin
- Roepera compressa (J.M.Black) Beier & Thulin
- Roepera confluens (H.Eichler) Beier & Thulin
- Roepera cordifolia (L.f.) Beier & Thulin
- Roepera crassissima (Ising) Beier & Thulin
- Roepera crenata (F.Muell.) Beier & Thulin
- Roepera cuneifolia (Eckl. & Zeyh.) Beier & Thulin
- Roepera debilis (Cham.) Beier & Thulin
- Roepera divaricata (Eckl. & Zeyh.) Beier & Thulin
- Roepera eichleri (R.M.Barker) Beier & Thulin
- Roepera emarginata (H.Eichler) Beier & Thulin
- Roepera eremaea (Diels) Beier & Thulin
- Roepera flava (H.Eichler ex R.M.Barker) Beier & Thulin
- Roepera flexuosa (Eckl. & Zeyh.) Beier & Thulin
- Roepera foetida (Schrad. & J.C.Wendl.) Beier & Thulin
- Roepera fruticulosa (DC.) G.Don
- Roepera fulva (L.) Beier & Thulin
- Roepera fuscata (Van Zyl) Beier & Thulin
- Roepera glauca (F.Muell.) Beier & Thulin
- Roepera halophila (R.M.Barker) Beier & Thulin
- Roepera hirticaulis (Van Zyl) Beier & Thulin
- Roepera horrida (Cham.) Beier & Thulin
- Roepera howittii (F.Muell.) Beier & Thulin
- Roepera humillima (Max Koch ex Tate) Beier & Thulin
- Roepera hybrida (Tate) Beier & Thulin
- Roepera incrustata (E.Mey. ex Sond.) Beier & Thulin
- Roepera iodocarpa (F.Muell.) Beier & Thulin
- Roepera kochii (Tate) Beier & Thulin
- Roepera leptopetala (E.Mey. ex Sond.) Beier & Thulin
- Roepera leucoclada (Diels) Beier & Thulin
- Roepera lichtensteiniana (Cham.) Beier & Thulin
- Roepera lobulata (Benth.) Beier & Thulin
- Roepera macrocarpos (Retief) Beier & Thulin
- Roepera maculata (Aiton) Beier & Thulin
- Roepera maritima (Eckl. & Zeyh.) Beier & Thulin
- Roepera marliesiae (R.M.Barker) Beier & Thulin
- Roepera microphylla (L.f.) Beier & Thulin
- Roepera morgsana (L.) Beier & Thulin
- Roepera orbiculata (Welw. ex Oliv.) Beier & Thulin
- Roepera ovata (Ewart & Jean White) Beier & Thulin
- Roepera prismatotheca (F.Muell.) Beier & Thulin
- Roepera pubescens (Schinz) Beier & Thulin
- Roepera pygmaea (Eckl. & Zeyh.) Beier & Thulin
- Roepera reticulata (H.Eichler ex R.M.Barker) Beier & Thulin
- Roepera retivalvis (Domin) Beier & Thulin
- Roepera rogersii (Compton) Beier & Thulin
- Roepera rowelliae (R.M.Barker) Beier & Thulin
- Roepera schreiberiana (Merxm. & Giess) Beier & Thulin
- Roepera sessilifolia (L.) Beier & Thulin
- Roepera similis (H.Eichler) Beier & Thulin
- Roepera sphaerocarpa (Schltr. ex Huysst.) Beier & Thulin
- Roepera spinosa (L.) Beier & Thulin
- Roepera teretifolia (Schltr.) Beier & Thulin
- Roepera tesquorum (J.M.Black) Beier & Thulin
- Roepera tetraptera (H.Eichler ex R.M.Barker) Beier & Thulin

== Distribution ==
Roepera has a discontinuous distribution. Species are native to Australia, and to the western side of southern Africa (Angola, Botswana, Namibia, and the Cape Provinces and Free State of South Africa). The genus appears to have originated in Africa, and dispersed into Australia about 12 million years ago. Species are found in warm and arid areas.

== Gallery ==
African species

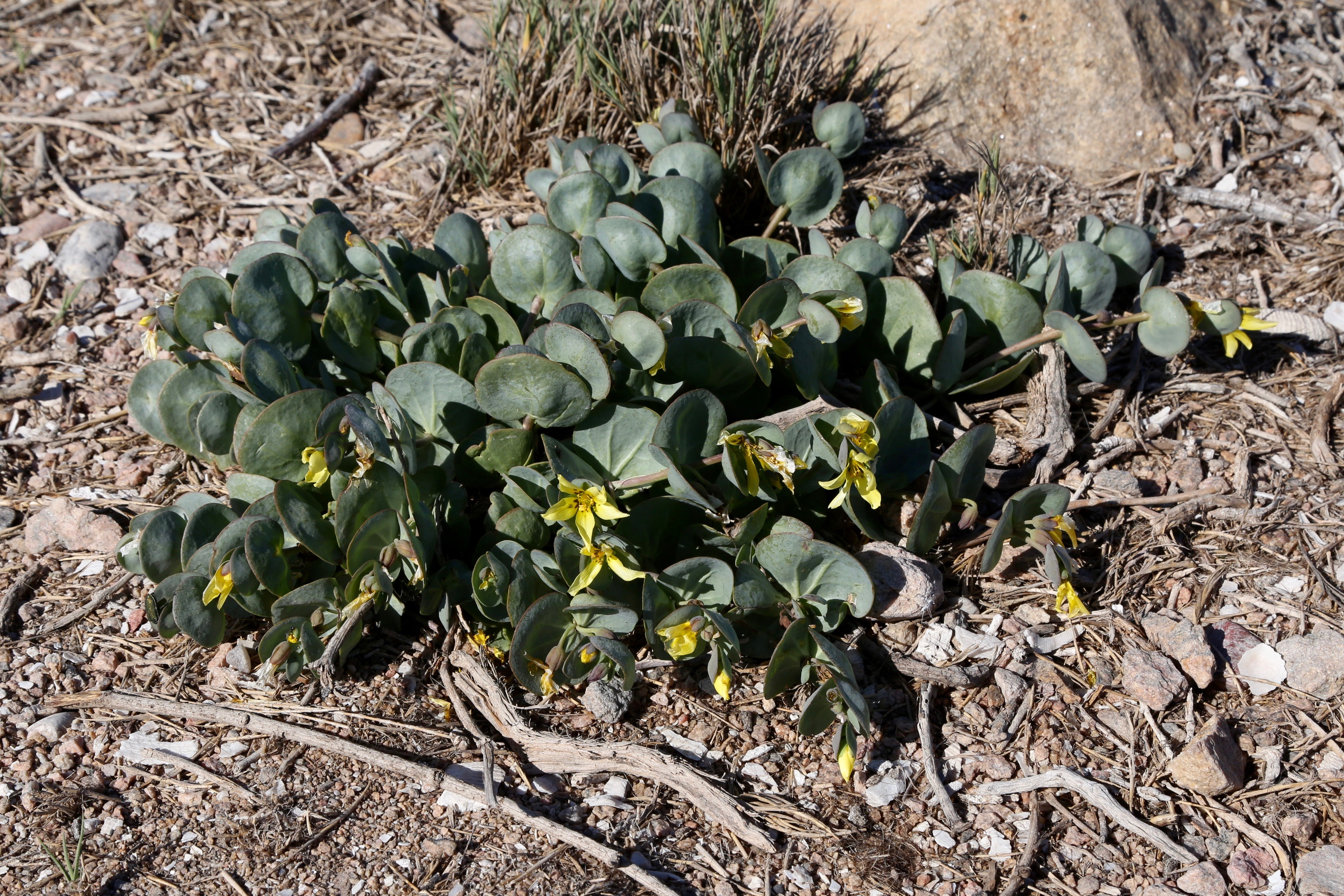
Roepera cordifolia, Namaqualand Dune Strandveld

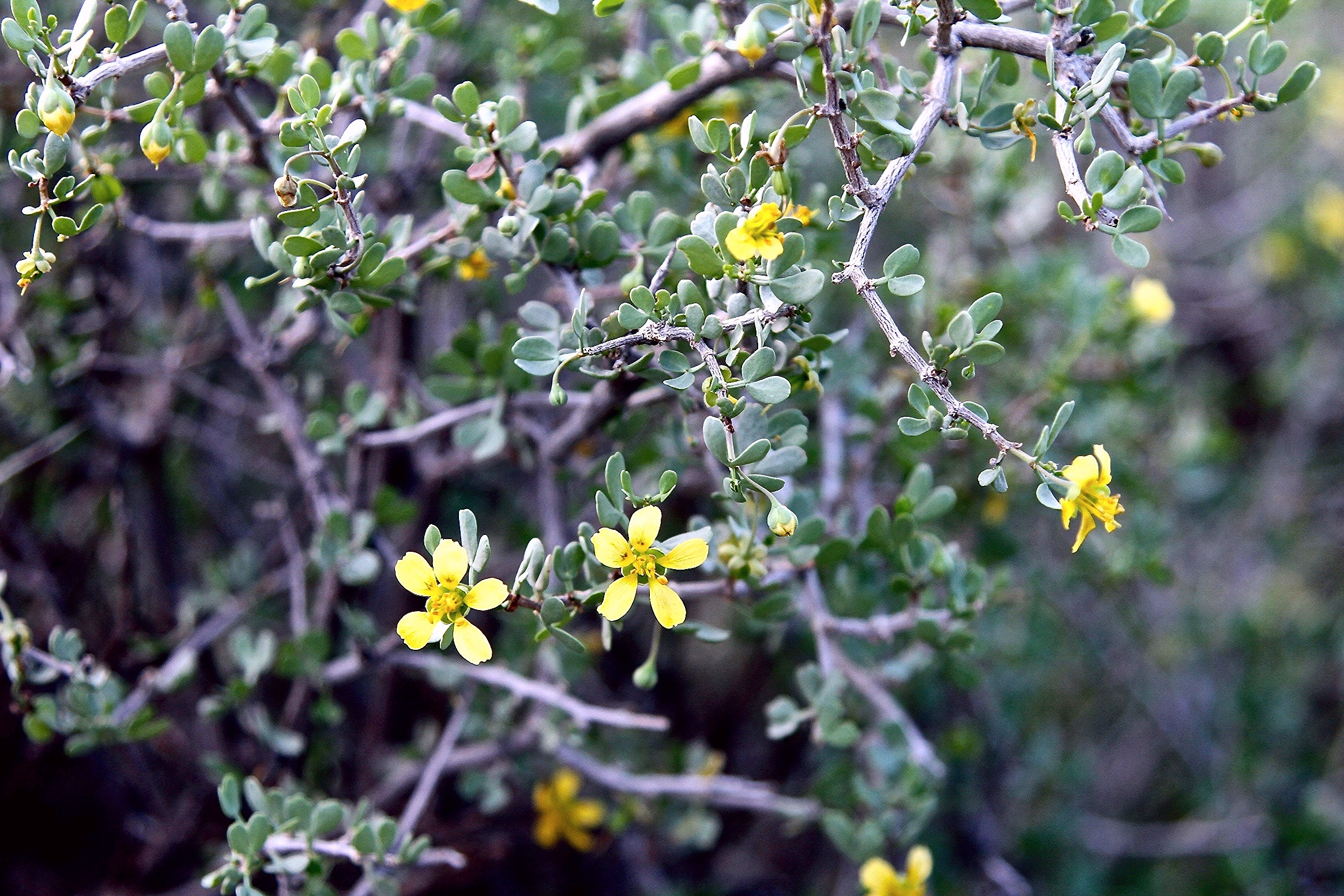
Roepera lichtensteiniana in the Karoo National Park

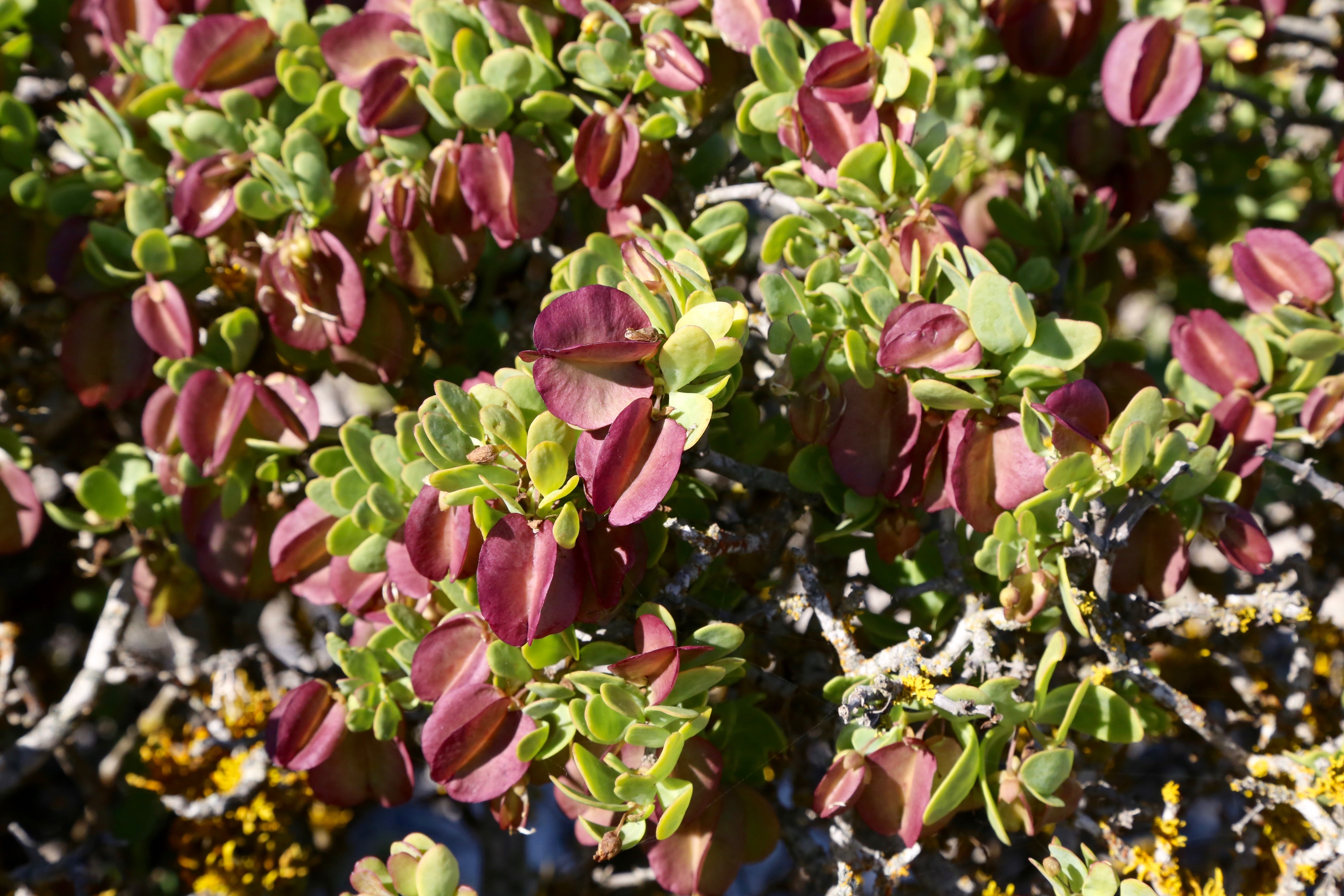
Roepera morgsana in fruit, coastline of Namaqua National Park

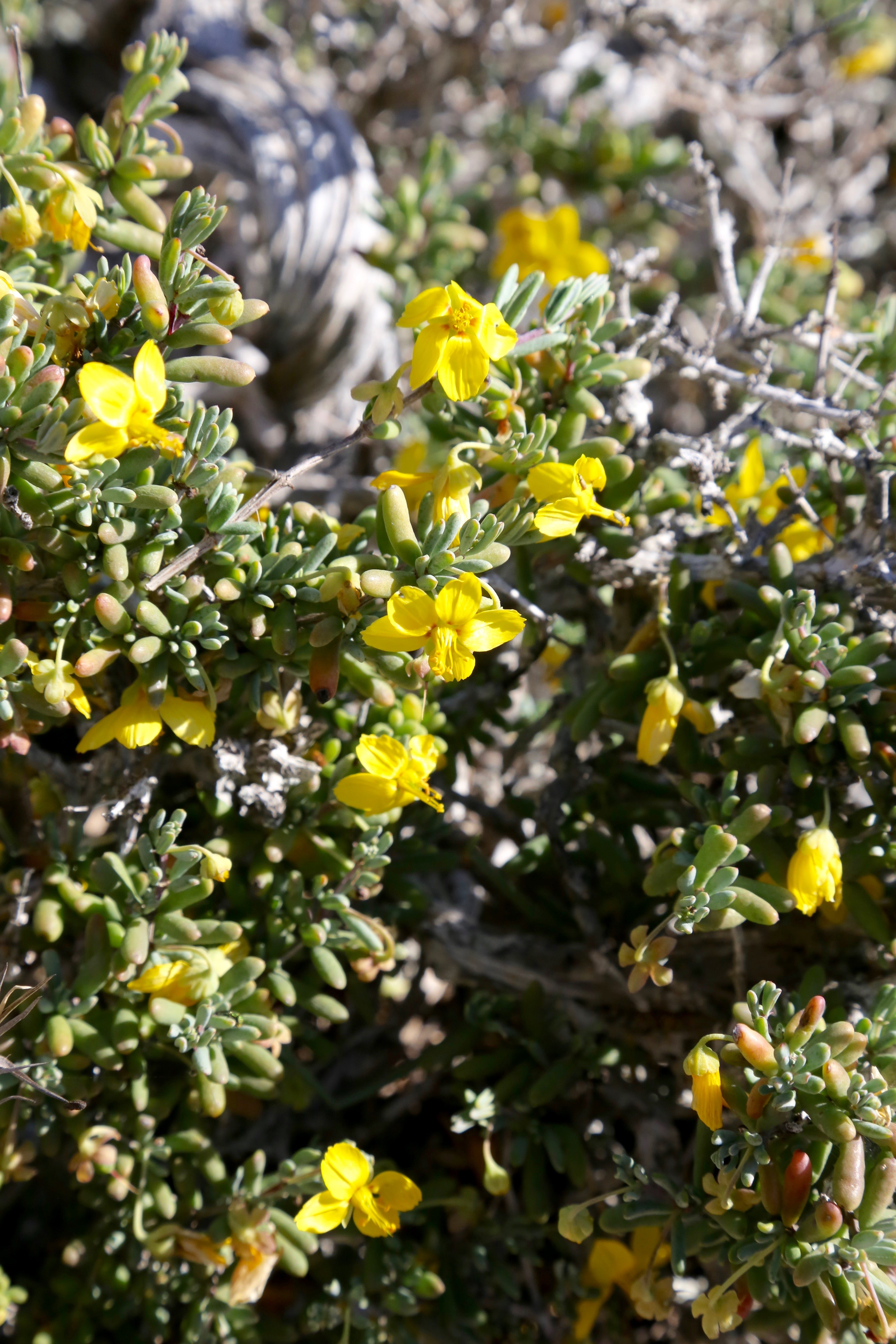
Roepera spinosa, coastline of Namaqua National Park
Australian species

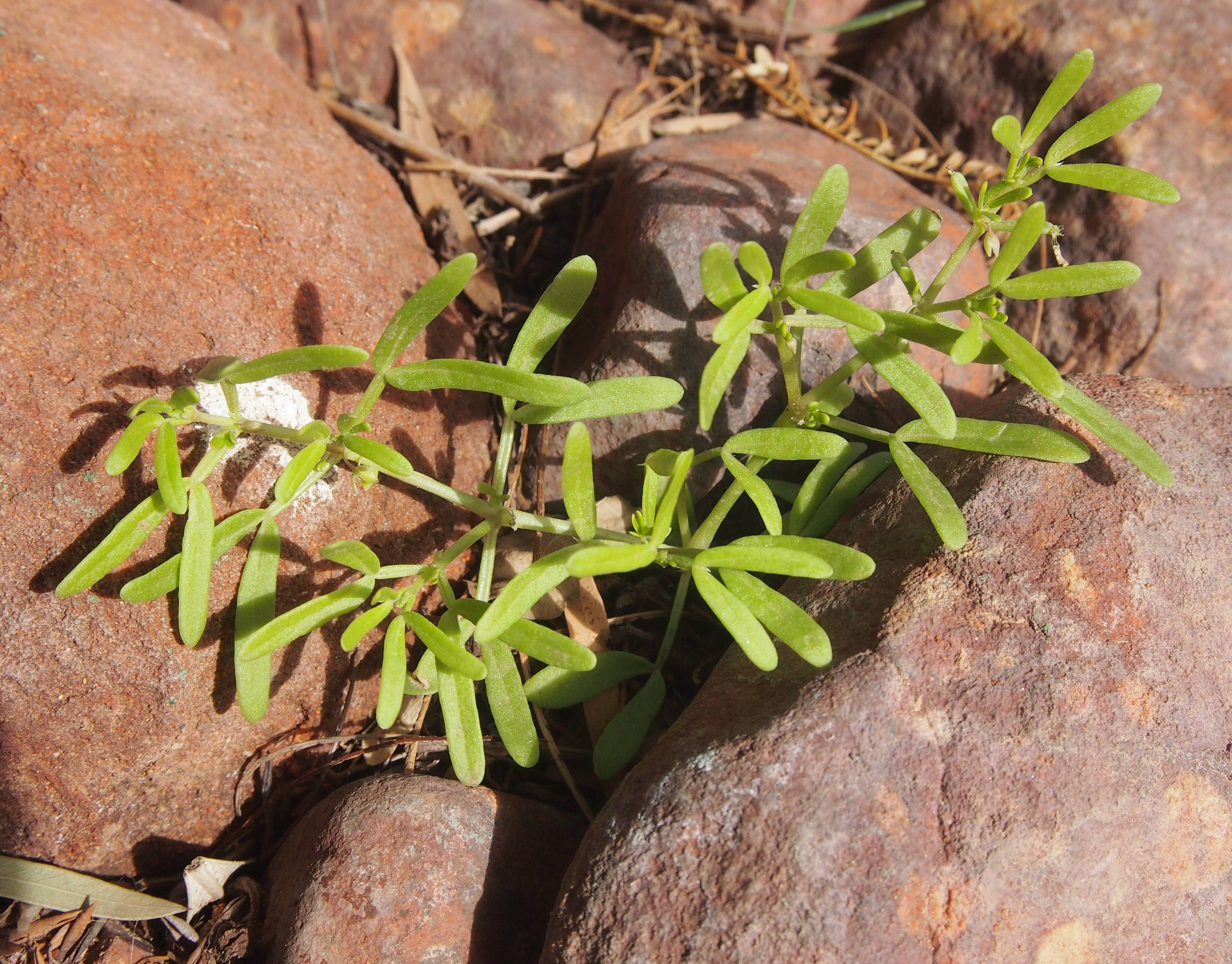
Roepera ammophila in habit, Australia

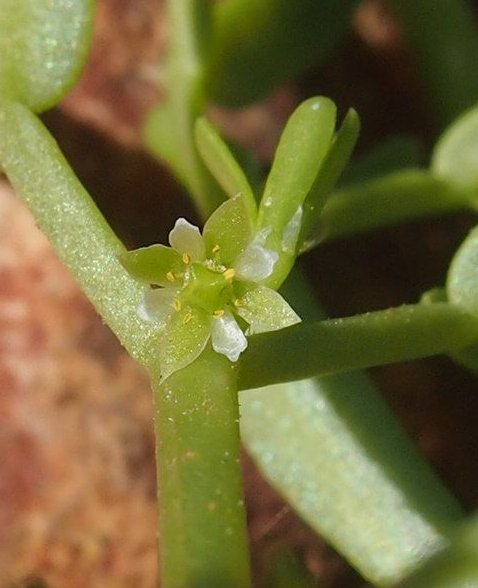
Flower of Roepera ammophila

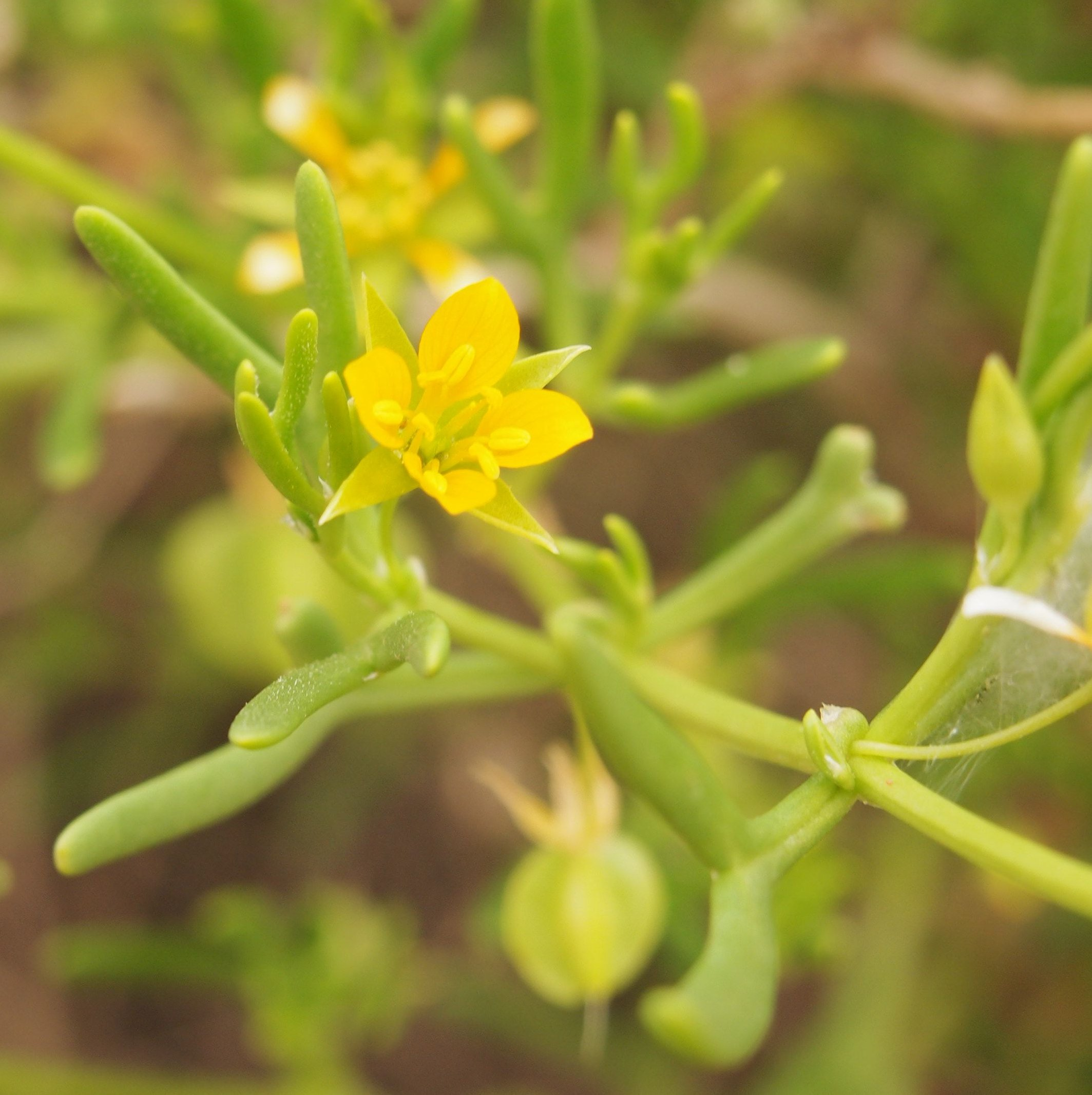
Flower of Roepera eremaea from Australia

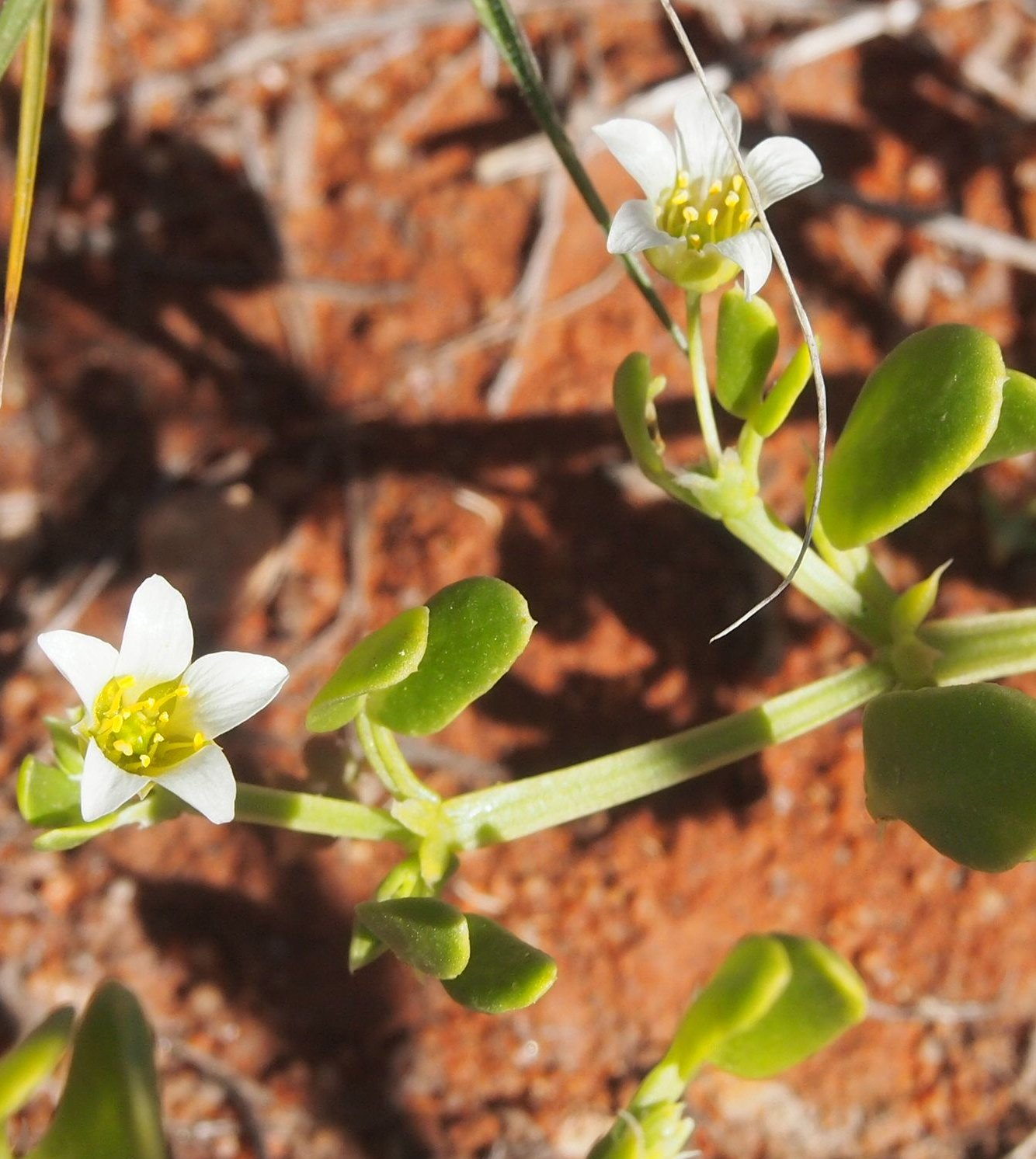
Roepera tesquorum from Australia
