= Grehan =

Grehan is a surname. Notable people with the surname include:

- Ceara Grehan, Northern Irish theatrical and opera singer
- Danny Grehan (born 1965), Welsh actor
- Derry Grehan (born 1957), Canadian guitarist
- Francie Grehan, Gaelic footballer
- James Grehan, Australian singer and songwriter
- Martin Grehan (born 1984), Scottish footballer
- Stephen Grehan (born 1971), Irish retired hurler
- Stuart Grehan (born 1992), Irish golfer
