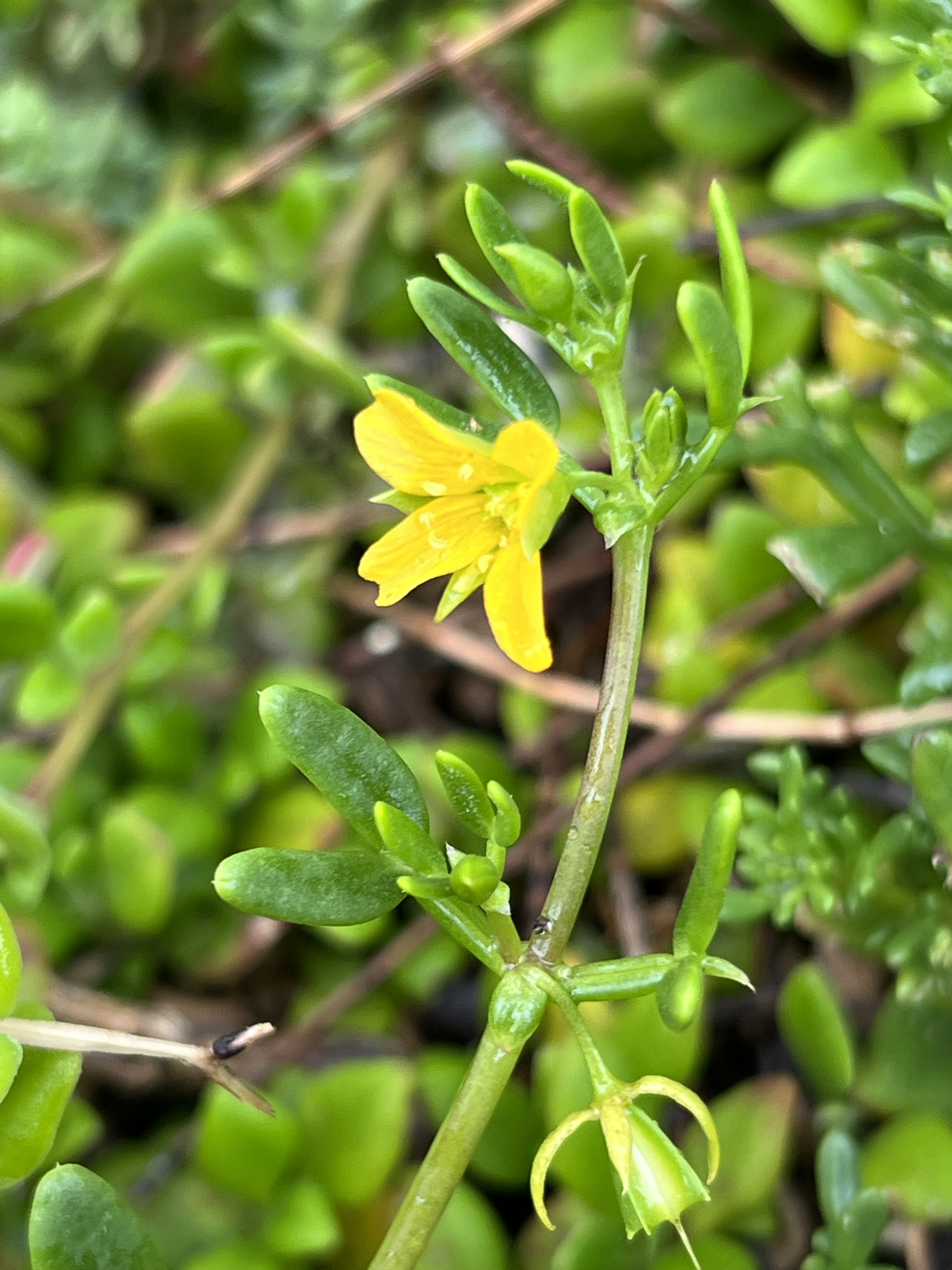

Scientific classification
- Kingdom: Plantae
- Clade: Tracheophytes
- Clade: Angiosperms
- Clade: Eudicots
- Clade: Rosids
- Order: Zygophyllales
- Family: Zygophyllaceae
- Genus: Roepera
- Species: R. billardierei

Binomial name
- Roepera billardierei (DC.) G.Don

Synonyms
- Zygophyllum billardierei DC.

= Roepera billardierei =

Coast twin-leaf

Species of plant

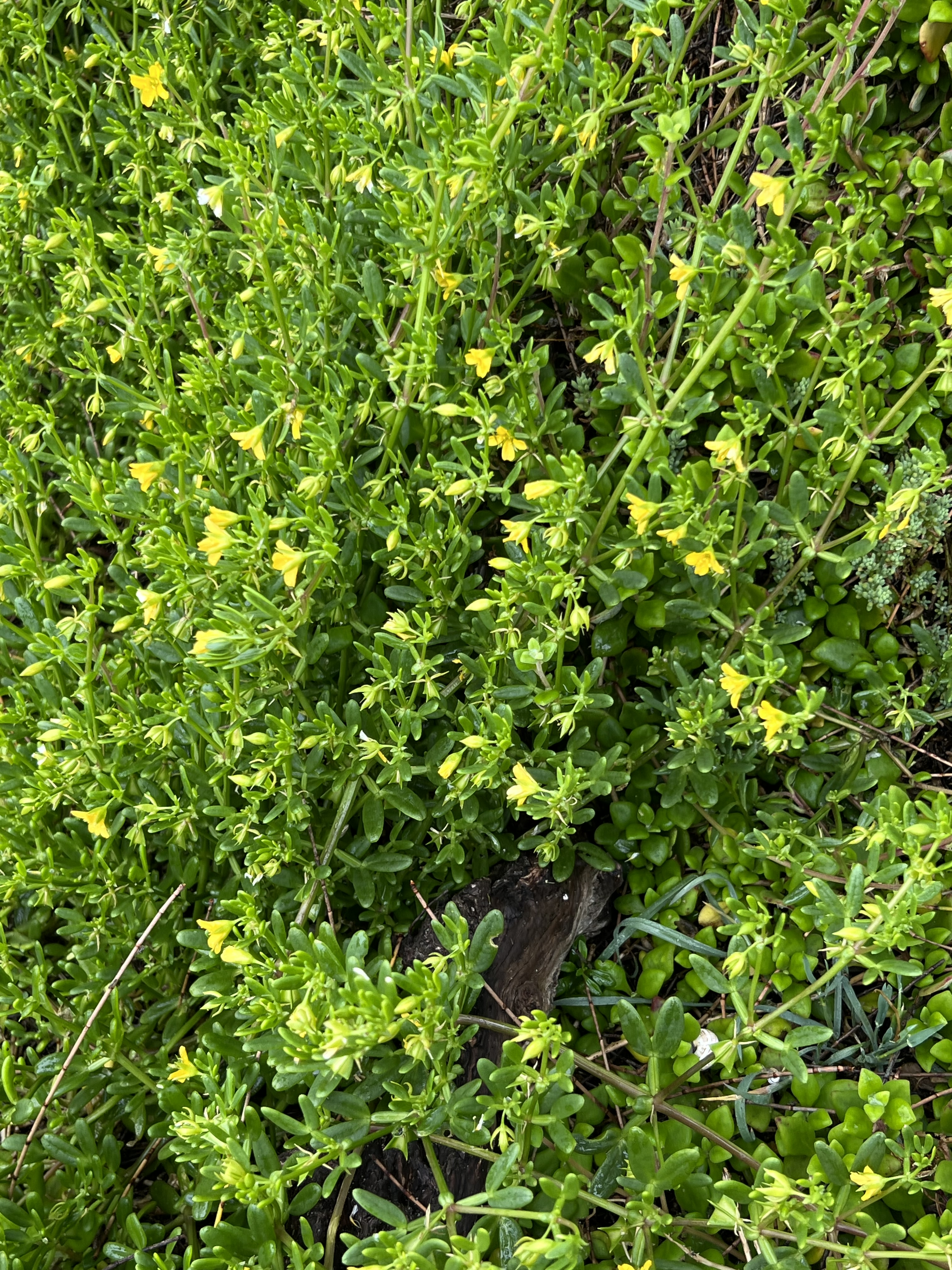
Habit

Roepera billardierei, synonym Zygophyllum billardierei, commonly known as coast twin-leaf, is a species of plant in the family Zygophyllaceae found in temperate regions of Australia. In Tasmania, where it has only been recorded from the Furneaux Group in Bass Strait, it is listed as Rare under the state's Threatened Species Protection Act 1995.

== Description ==
Coast twin-leaf is a perennial herb with stems that spread over the ground. The stems are branched and 20–40 millimetres [mm] (0.79–1.57 in) long. The leaves are Y-shaped, with blunt tips, and up to 15 mm (0.59 in) long. The flowers are yellow and about 10 mm (0.39 in) long. The fruit is a drooping four-angled capsule about 10–12 mm (0.39–0.47 in) long, containing brown seeds. It is a scrambling plant which is found in both sheltered and exposed coastal sites where it stabilises loose sand on dunes.
