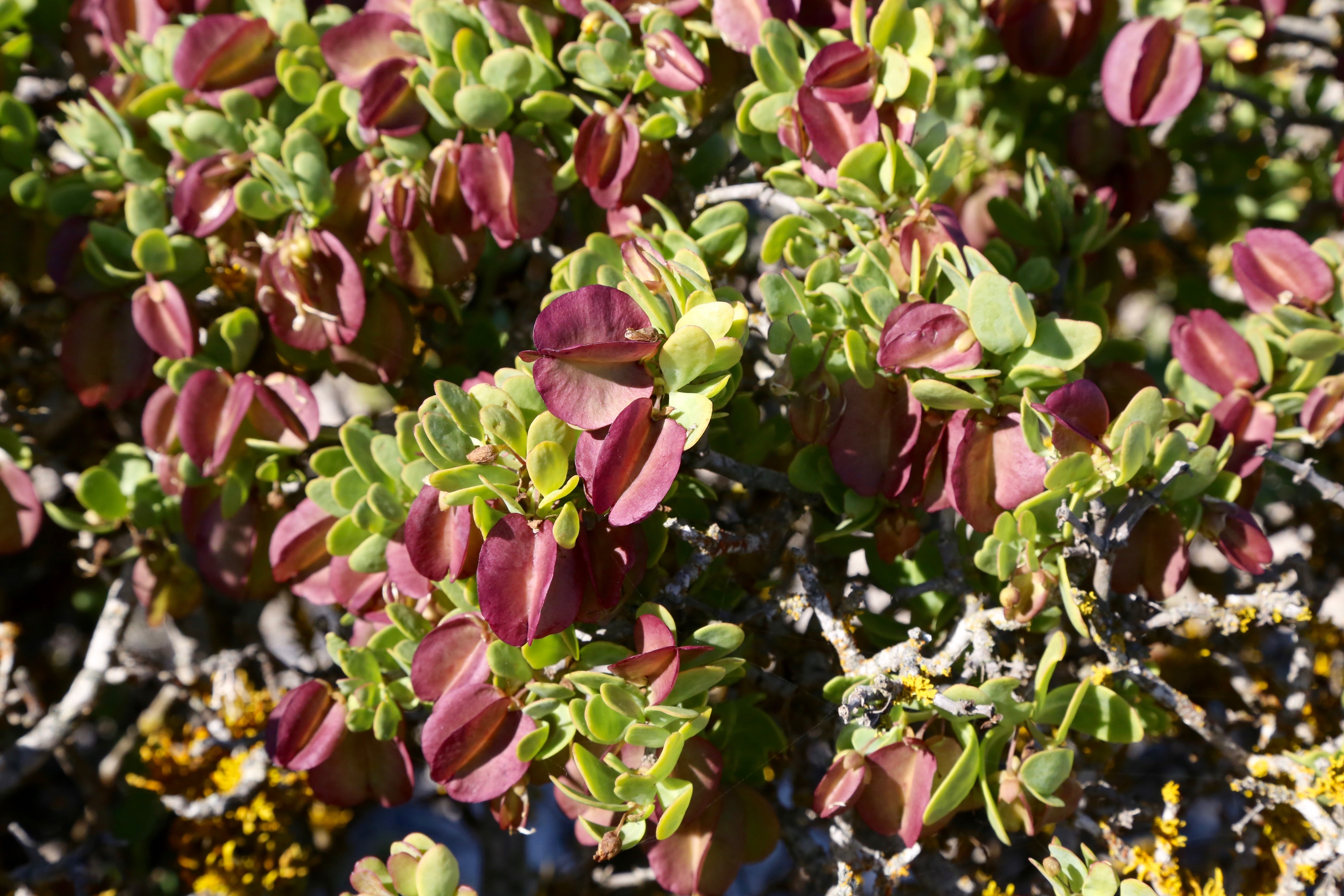

Conservation status
- Least Concern (SANBI Red List)

Scientific classification
- Kingdom: Plantae
- Clade: Embryophytes
- Clade: Tracheophytes
- Clade: Spermatophytes
- Clade: Angiosperms
- Clade: Eudicots
- Clade: Rosids
- Order: Zygophyllales
- Family: Zygophyllaceae
- Genus: Roepera
- Species: R. morgsana

Binomial name
- Roepera morgsana (L.) Beier & Thulin

Synonyms
- Zygophyllum lichtensteinianum Eckl. & Zeyh.; Zygophyllum morgsana L.; Zygophyllum succulentum Salisb.

= Roepera morgsana =

Succulent endemic to southern Africa

Roepera morgsana, the salad twinleaf (or slaaibos in Afrikaans), is a succulent plant species in the family Zygophyllaceae. It is endemic to Namibia and the Cape Provinces of South Africa.

== Distribution ==
Roepera morgsana is found mostly in the Nama Karoo and Succulent Karoo biomes, but also in the Eastern Cape.
