= Warning: May Contain Nuts =

Warning: May Contain Nuts is a comedy project organised by BBC Radio Berkshire and charity Company Paradiso involving performance and creative writing related to mental illness that was run in the United Kingdom during 2010. The project was intended to raise awareness of mental health issues and included creative workshops aimed at helping mental health service users in the counties of Sussex and Berkshire to express themselves. The project was launched on 11 May 2010 in Reading with performances from poet John Hegley and comedian Mackenzie Taylor. As part of the project Radio Berkshire broadcast material developed in the workshops over a week at the end of May. Further shows took place as part of the project including a cabaret stand-up comedy night at the Brighton Comedy Festival in October 2010. Hegley (as compère) and Taylor performed at this show along with mental health service users including Northern Irish blogger Seaneen Molloy.

BBC Radio Berkshire and Company Paradiso received a Silver and Gold award at the Gillard BBC Radio Awards and were nominated for an award from Radio Broadcasting at the 2010 Mind Media Awards. The project won gold in the "Best Community Programming" category at the Sony Radio Awards in May 2011.
