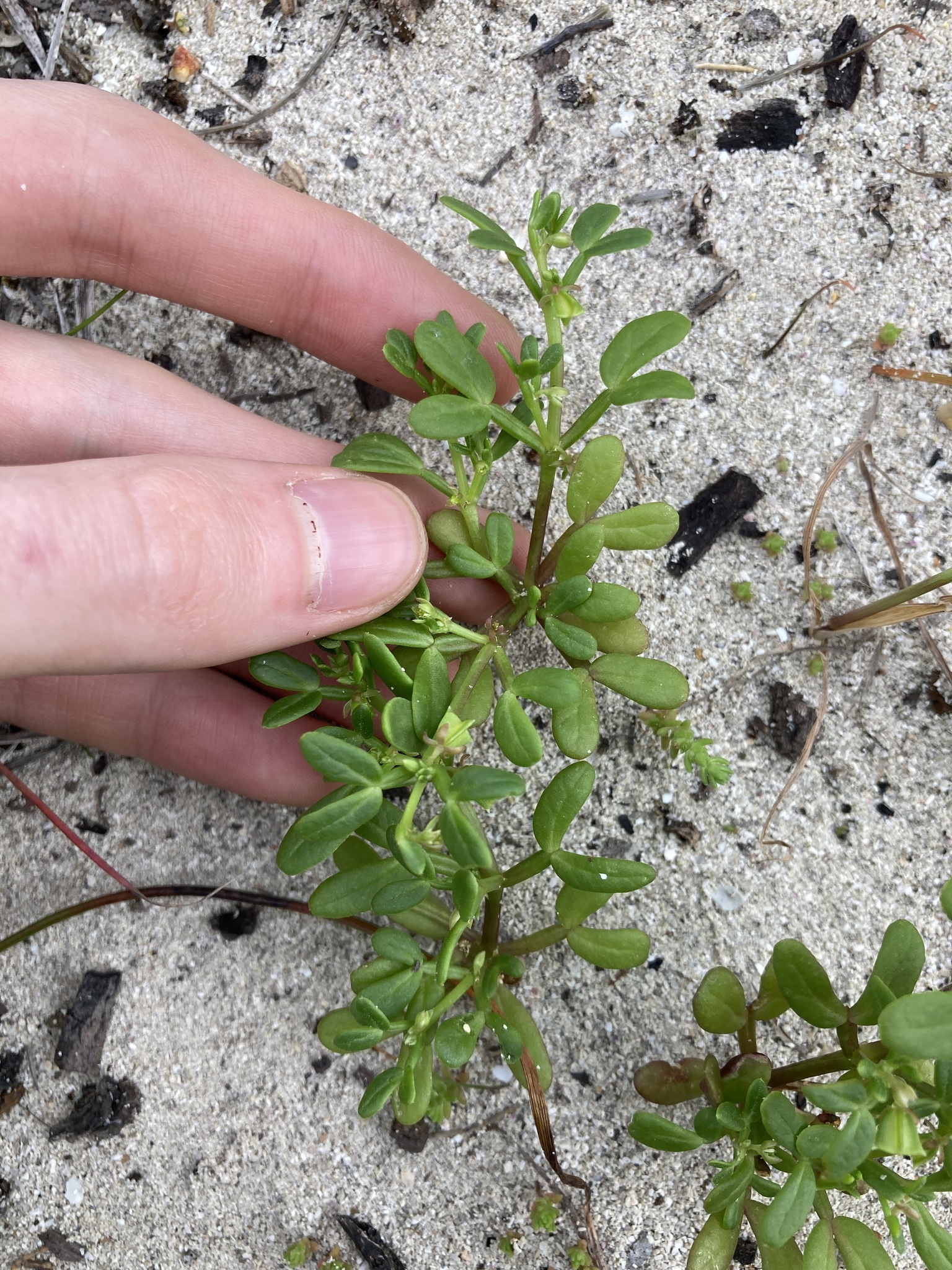

Scientific classification
- Kingdom: Plantae
- Clade: Tracheophytes
- Clade: Angiosperms
- Clade: Eudicots
- Clade: Rosids
- Order: Zygophyllales
- Family: Zygophyllaceae
- Genus: Roepera
- Species: R. similis

Binomial name
- Roepera similis (H.Eichler) Beier & Thulin

Synonyms
- Zygophyllum simile H.Eichler

= Roepera similis =

Species of plant

Roepera similis (synonym Zygophyllum simile) is a succulent annual herb native to Australia.

== Description ==
It grows as a prostrate or erect annual herb, branching from the base and reaching a height of from four to 60 centimeters. Flowers are yellow or white.

== Taxonomy ==
Roepera similis was first described in 1990 by Hansjörg Eichler as Zygophyllum simile, based on a specimen has collected from the Musgrave Ranges in South Australia in 1963. It was transferred to the genus Roepera in 2003, when Zygophyllum as then circumscribed was found not to be monophyletic.

== Distribution and habitat ==
It occurs in every mainland state of Australia, favouring red or grey sandy soils.
