= Mackenzie Taylor =

British comedian

- Born: Andrew Iain Mackenzie Taylor; 8 September 1978; Crewe, Cheshire, England
- Died: 18 November 2010 (aged 32); Guildford, Surrey, England

Comedy career
- Medium: Stand-up

Andrew Iain Mackenzie Taylor (8 September 1978 – 18 November 2010) was a British comic, writer and director.

== Early life ==
Born in Crewe, Cheshire, his family moved to Camberley, in Surrey, when he was still a baby. Taylor attended Royal Grammar School in Guildford and was a member of the Surrey Youth Theatre. Taylor was diagnosed with bipolar schizoaffective disorder at the age of 15. He worked as an accounts assistant for a firm of quantity surveyors in Chobham, Surrey.

== Career ==
He started his comedy career in the sketch and improvisational group Wayward Council. He co-founded Phone Book Live!, in which guests attempted to be funny by reading from a telephone directory. Performers included Nicholas Parsons, Les Dennis and Maureen Lipman; proceeds from Phone Box Live! were donated to the mental health charity Mind.

Taylor was diagnosed with bipolar schizoaffective disorder at the age of 15. He turned his suicide attempt in 2008, in which he slipped into a drug-induced coma in the Komedia comedy club in Brighton, into an acclaimed show, No Straightjacket Required, at the 2009 Edinburgh Festival Fringe. He performed the show again at the Fringe in 2010, alongside his new show, Joy.

Taylor participated in "Warning: May Contain Nuts", a project launched by John Hegley to use comedy to increase awareness of mental illness. He performed an abridged version of No Straightjacket Required, which The Independent described as "his remarkable true story about struggling with mental illness and his suicide attempt manages to be both unflinchingly candid yet consistently entertaining."

== Death ==
Taylor died on 18 November 2010 at the age of 32 after taking an overdose of drugs. His funeral took place on 8 December at St Michael & All Angels' church in Pirbright, near Woking, Surrey.
