= Hallianthus =

Scientific classification
- Kingdom: Plantae
- Clade: Embryophytes
- Clade: Tracheophytes
- Clade: Spermatophytes
- Clade: Angiosperms
- Clade: Eudicots
- Order: Caryophyllales
- Family: Aizoaceae
- Subfamily: Ruschioideae
- Tribe: Ruschieae
- Genus: Hallianthus; H.E.K.Hartmann
- Species: H. planus

Binomial name
- Hallianthus planus (L.Bolus) H.E.K.Hartmann

Synonyms
- Leipoldtia compressa L.Bolus; Leipoldtia plana (L.Bolus) L.Bolus

Genus of plants

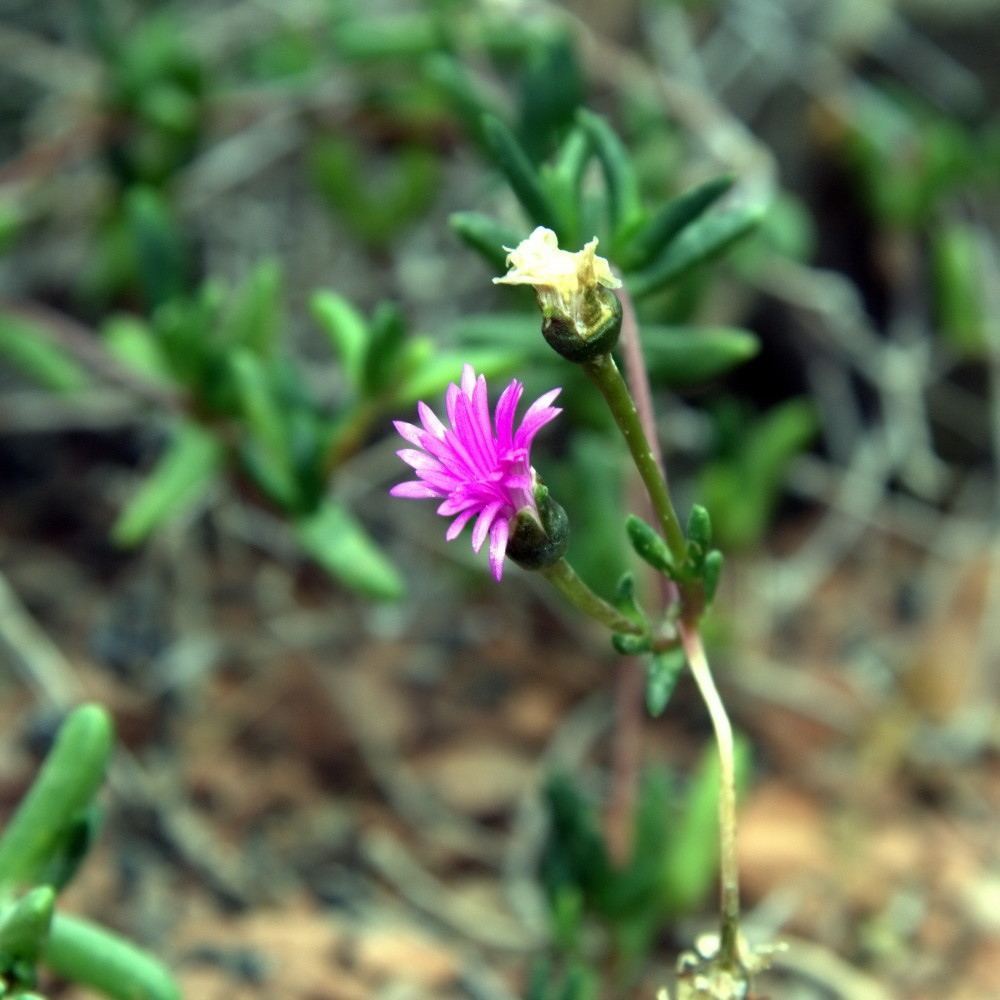
Hallianthus planus

Hallianthus is a monotypic genus of flowering plants belonging to the family Aizoaceae. It only contains one species, Hallianthus planus

It is native to the Cape Provinces of the South African Republic.

The genus name of Hallianthus is in honour of Harry Hall (1906–1986), a British-born horticulturist, botanist and succulent plant authority. The Latin specific epithet of planus refers to flat. Hallianthus planus was first described and published in Bot. Jahrb. Syst. Vol.104 on page 167 in 1983.
