= Saint and Blurry =

Studio album by John Hegley
- Released: 1993
- Label: Rykodisc
- Producer: various

Saint and Blurry is an album by John Hegley released in 1993 by Rykodisc.

It consists of a mixture of poems and songs. All poems were written by Hegley but some songs were written by Hegley with Nigel Piper.

== Track listing ==
An asterisk indicates songs

1. In The Beginning
2. Trainspotters*
3. The Martian
4. Song About Cleaning Your Glasses*
5. Luton
6. The Children in the Playground
7. Greavsie
8. Eddie Don't Like Furniture*
9. Yorkie
10. Mr. McNaulty
11. A Dog's Life*
12. Well Bread Dog
13. Sumo*
14. Pat
15. Colin*
16. The Briefcase
17. Contact Lenses Out*
18. Bad Dog
19. Very Bad Dog*
20. Malcolm
21. Death of a Dog*
22. Seaing the Sea
23. The Edinburgh Tattoo
24. Poetry*
