= John Hegley =

British writer, musician and comedian

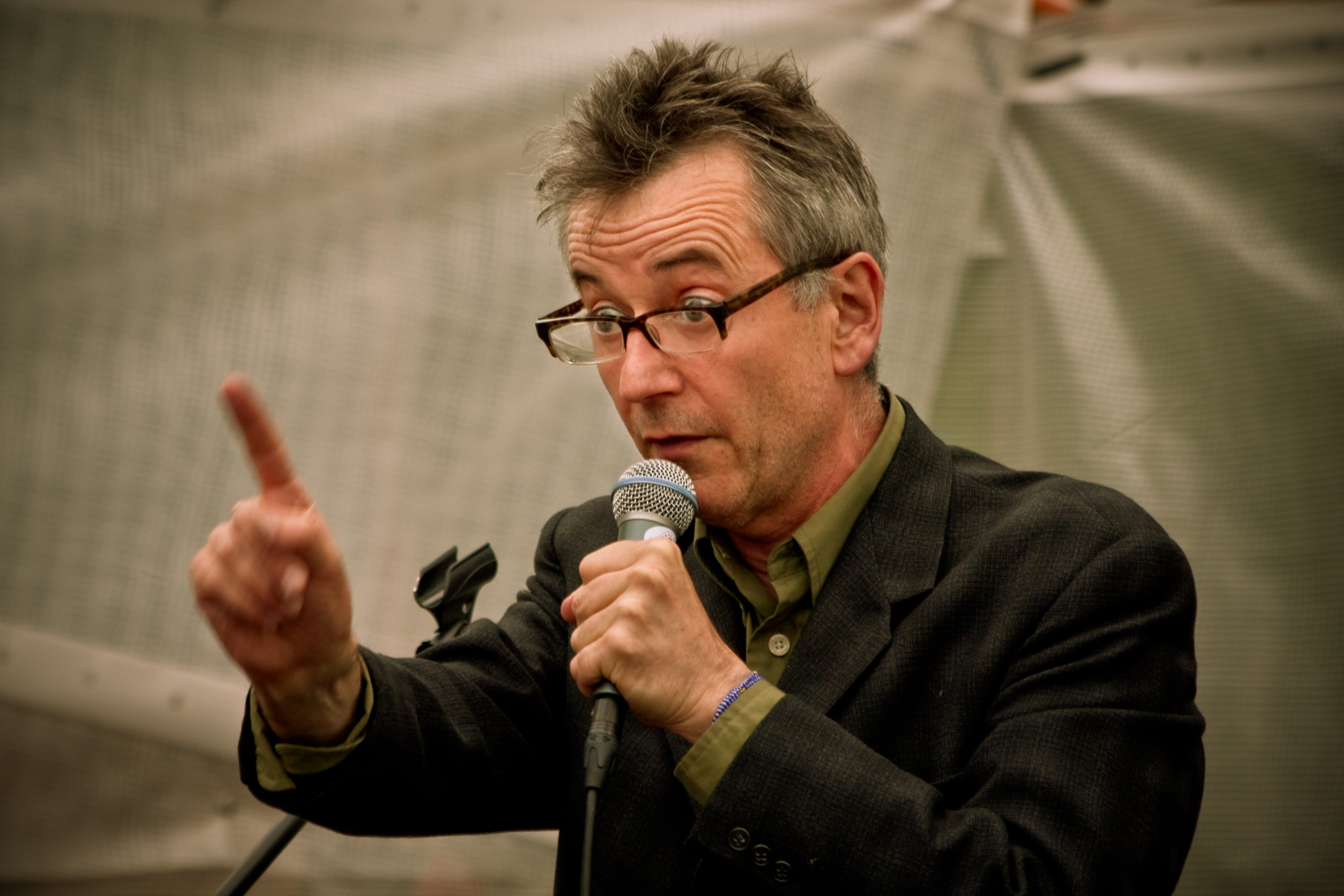
- Hegley in 2009
- Born: 1 October 1953 (age 73); Newington Green, London, England
- Education: University of Bradford
- Occupations: Writer, radio broadcaster, musician and comedian

Comedy career
- Medium: Performance poetry, Stand-up comedy
- Website: johnhegley.co.uk

John Richard Hegley (born 1 October 1953) is an English performance poet, comedian, radio broadcaster, musician and songwriter. He is known for his frequent appearances at literary festivals, and for his wry and surreal humour, mostly performance-orientated or aimed at younger audiences, and often sung or accompanied by music he plays; his material incorporates "a mix of anecdotes, jokes, idiosyncratic observations, confessions and surreal narratives".

== Early life ==
Hegley was born in the Newington Green area of Islington in London, into a Roman Catholic household. He was brought up in Luton and later Bristol, where he attended Rodway School (now Mangotsfield School). After school, he worked as a bus conductor and civil servant, before attending the University of Bradford, where he gained a BSc in European Literature and the History of Ideas and Sociology. Hegley has French ancestry (his father's name was René) and claims he is descended from the composer Jean-Philippe Rameau. His paternal grandmother was a dancer with the Folies Bergère.

== Career ==
Hegley began his performing career at London's Comedy Store in 1980, and toured as one half of The Brown Paper Bag Brothers with Otiz Cannelloni. He appeared with his backing band the Popticians on Carrott's Lib in 1983, and recorded two sessions for John Peel in 1983 and 1984.

Hegley published his first poetry collection in 1984, Visions of the Bone Idol (Poems about Dogs and Glasses) – pieces from which were later incorporated into Glad to Wear Glasses. Further collections followed whose subject matter ranges from the surreal and the humorous through to the personal and emotional. There are several recurring themes in his work, including glasses, dogs or Romans, along with self-deprecating humour and reminiscences of his childhood in Luton.

He was presenter of the 1990s Border Television series Word of Mouth, in which contemporary poets performed their work, and the BBC Radio series Hearing with Hegley from 1996 to 1999. His other television appearances include Wogan and Never Mind the Buzzcocks. In 1998, Hegley's poem "Malcolm" came second in a BBC survey to find Britain's most popular comic poem. In 1999, he starred in a Simon Callow-directed revival of the musical The Pajama Game in London's West End.

In September 1999, together with Simon Munnery, he wrote and performed in a comedy series for BBC Radio 4 entitled The Adventures of John and Tony.

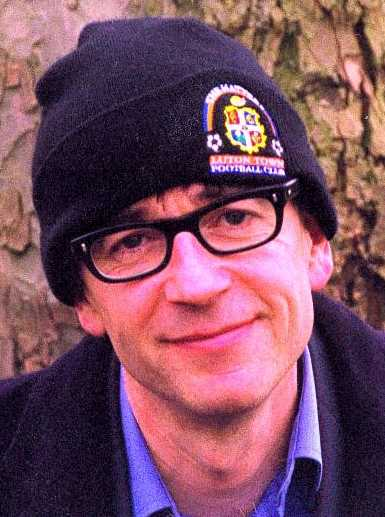
Hegley in a Luton Town FC supporter's cap

Hegley frequently performs live and is a regular at literary and comedic venues, particularly the Edinburgh Festival. His stage act includes elements of poetry, music (he plays the mandolin and is often accompanied by a double bassist), comedy and references to Luton Town Football Club. He often encourages audience participation in his shows, through drawing or through competitions. The University of Luton awarded him an honorary LL.D. in 2000, and he has also led creative writing courses at the university.

Hegley launched "Warning: May Contain Nuts", a project using comedy to increase awareness of mental illness. He performed these shows in 2010 with other performers, including comic Mackenzie Taylor, exploring with audiences issues surrounding mental illness.

== Books ==
- Visions of the Bone Idol (Poems about Dogs and Glasses), illustrated by Linda Leatherbarrow (Little Bird Press, 1984), ASIN: B0016ZKLU2
- The Brother-in-Law and Other Animals (Down the Publishing Company, 1986)
- Poems for Pleasure (Hamlyn, 1989)
- Glad to Wear Glasses (glad to have ears), illustrated by Linda Leatherbarrow (Andre Deutsch, 1990) ISBN 978-0-233-05035-5
- Can I Come Down Now, Dad? (Methuen, 1991)
- Five Sugars, Please (Methuen 1993)
- These Were Your Father's (Methuen, 1994)
- Love Cuts (Methuen, 1995, and Mandarin, 1996, ISBN 9780749321949)
- The Family Pack (Methuen, 1997: incorporating The Brother-in-Law and Other Animals, Can I Come Down Now, Dad? and These Were Your Father's. ISBN 9780413717306)
- Beyond our Kennel (Methuen, 1998)
- Dog (Methuen, 2000)
- My Dog is a Carrot (Walker Books, 2002)
- The Sound of Paint Drying (Methuen, 2003)
- Sit-Down Comedy (contributor to anthology, ed. Malcolm Hardee & John Fleming) Ebury Press/Random House, 2003. ISBN 0-09-188924-3; ISBN 978-0-09-188924-1
- Uncut Confetti (Methuen, 2006)
- The Ropes: Poems To Hold on To (editor with Sophie Hannah) (Diamond Twig, 2008)
- The Adventures of Monsieur Robinet (Donut Press, 2009)
- Stanley's Stick (Hodder's Children's Books, 2012)
- Peace, Love & Potatoes (Serpent's Tail 2012)
- New & Selected Potatoes (Bloodaxe Books Ltd, 2013)
- I am a Poetato: An A-Z of poems about people, pets and other creatures (Frances Lincoln Children's Books, 2013, hardback; Otter Barry Books, 2022, paperback ISBN 978-1-91307-434-0)
- A Scarcity of Biscuit: Pieces drawn largely from the letters, life and laughter of John Keats (Caldew Press, 2021)

== Discography ==
- "Spare Pear" / "Mobile Home" (1984), double A-sided single of Peel session recordings, with the Popticians
- "I Saw My Dinner on TV" (1988), single with the Popticians
- Saint and Blurry (1993), poems and music
- Hearing with Hegley (1996), BBC audio-cassette taken from the radio series of the same name
- Family Favourites (2006), poems and music
