= Bolus Herbarium =

South African herbarium in Cape Town

Coordinates: 33.9565°S 18.4617°E

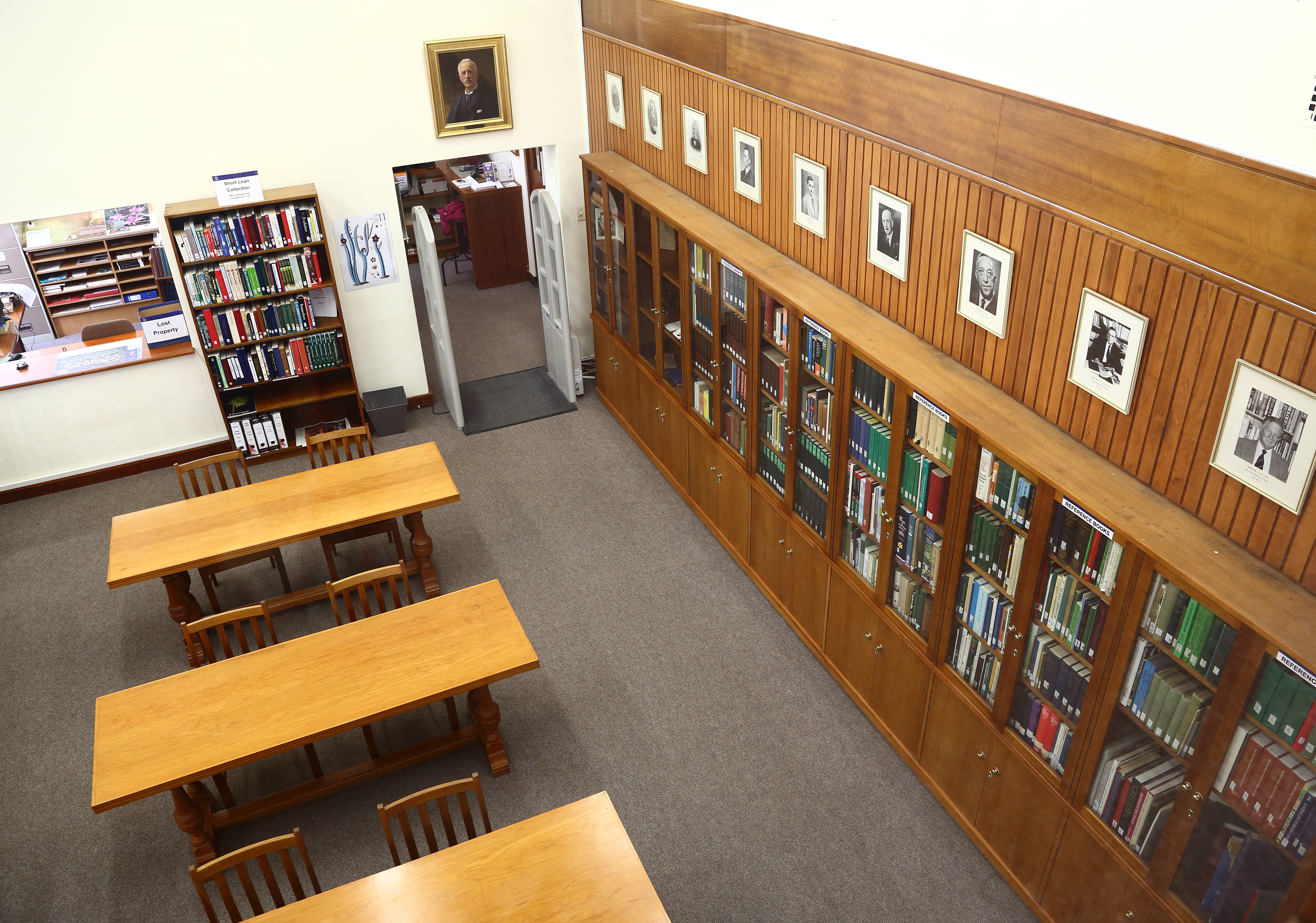
- An aerial view of the Bolus Herbarium Library in the HW Pearson Building, Upper Campus, University of Cape Town.
- Location: University of Cape Town, South Africa
- Type: Herbarium
- Scope: Southern African Flora, particularly the Cape Floristic Kingdom
- Established: 1865
- Service area: Botany

Collection
- Items collected: Botanical specimens
- Size: 350 000+

Other information
- Parent organization: Department of Biological Sciences, University of Cape Town
- Website: https://science.uct.ac.za/bolus-herbarium

The Bolus Herbarium was established in 1865 from a donation by Harry Bolus of his extensive herbarium and library to the South African College, which later became the University of Cape Town.

Its collection of specimens numbers over 320 000, making it the third largest university herbarium in the Southern Hemisphere. The collection is highly representative of the Cape Flora and also houses many type specimens. The international herbarium abbreviation BOL is used when referring to the Bolus Herbarium.

Although the building caught on fire during the 2021 Table Mountain fire, which gutted several other collections in the university including the Plant Conservation Unit, the Bolus Herbarium managed to narrowly escape being destroyed in the blaze.

== History ==
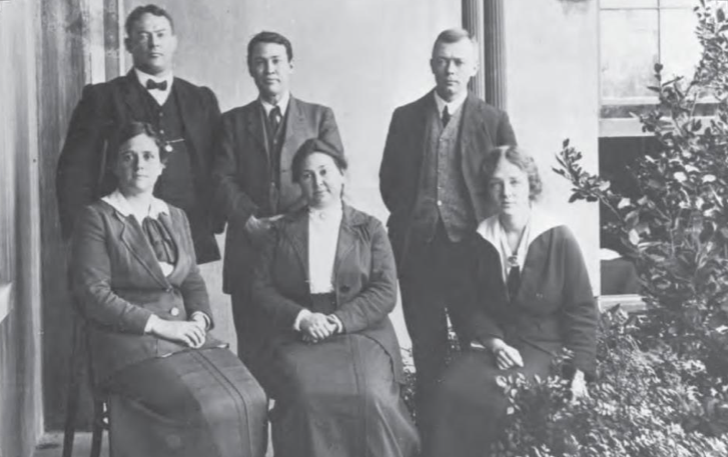
Staff of the Bolus Herbarium (1914)

Harry Bolus (1834–1911), a rich Cape Town businessman, began his collection in 1865 in Graaff-Reinet, and it is now the oldest functioning herbarium in the country. In 1903 Louisa Bolus who was a grand-niece of Harry Bolus was appointed a Curator of the herbarium. After his death, the South African College (which changed its name to the University of Cape Town on April 2, 1918) inherited his herbarium; a library featuring many expensive, unique, and rare books on botany; and a substantial amount of money for the maintenance and expansion of the collection. In 1924, a dedicated building was erected for the herbarium in Kirstenbosch, but it proved unsuitable later. Therefore, the herbarium was moved onto the campus in 1938. Louisa Bolus was also involved with the herbarium until her death in 1970.

== Goal ==
Botanical and ecological research at the herbarium runs the gamut. The focus is primarily on Cape Province flora, including their taxonomy, invasive plants, biogeography, systematics, and evolution. Scientists from around the world conduct research here.

== Special collections ==
The best-known of the several collections of plants in the herbarium are Harry Bolus's set of orchids and heaths, H.M.L. (Lulu) Bolus's Mesembryanthemum, Augusta Vera Duthie's fungi, and Henry Georges Fourcade's trees from the area between Humansdorp and George.

== Bequests ==
Several botanists bequeathed their collections of flora and books to the Bolus Herbarium. Among them were C. Louis Leipoldt in 1946, Fourcade in 1948, and Gen. Jan Smuts in 1950.

== Publications ==
Between 1915 and 1928, 4 editions were published of the Annals of the Bolus Herbarium. Later, Contributions from the Bolus Herbarium appeared.

== See also ==
- List of herbaria
- Isobel Agnes Arbuthnot
- Harry Bolus

== Bibliography ==
- Floyd, K.B. "The Bolus Herbarium. University of Cape Town." Lantern, tydskrif vir kennis en kultuur. Yearbook 23, no, 1, September 1973.
- Standard Encyclopaedia of Southern Africa, several vol. Cape Town: Nasou. 1970–1976.
