= Linda Leatherbarrow =

Scottish writer and illustrator

Linda Leatherbarrow is a prize-winning Scottish writer and illustrator. She is best known for her short story collection, Essential Kit, and her illustrations for John Hegley's comic poems in Visions of the Bone Idol. Her short stories have been broadcast on BBC Radio 4 and published in the British Council's New Writing 8, the London Magazine, Ambit and many other anthologies and literary journals. She is a regular contributor to the literary review, Slightly Foxed, and has interviewed many writers, including Rose Tremain, Kate Mosse, and Susan Hill, for New books magazine. In 2005 she was given an Arts Council Award.

== Biography ==
Linda Leatherbarrow was born in Dumfries, Scotland, and brought up in England and Scotland. In the 1970s, she studied art at Hornsey College of Art and Walthamstow Art School. In the 1980s, she worked with the comedian and poet John Hegley and published two books of his poems with her illustrations. She also took a postgraduate diploma in Communication Studies at Goldsmiths College, London, and began to write short prose fiction. Her stories were widely published and broadcast on BBC Radio 4. She is three times winner of the London Writer's Competition. In 1995, while working for Haringey Library Service and in collaboration with Haringey Arts Council, she set up the Haringey Literature Festival and co-ordinated it for three years. In 1998 she was made Reader in Residence for the London Borough of Enfield and arranged a series of high-profile literature promotions across the borough. In 2000 she was invited to teach on the Creative Writing MA at Middlesex University where she was a Senior Lecturer. She also taught at the City University and the City Literary Institute in London. In 2003, her short story Ride was selected for publication in Tapestry, a Norwegian anthology of British writing for students of English language and literature. Ride is included in the collection Essential Kit.

Describing Essential Kit, the writer Shena Mackay wrote:

A wide-ranging rich and surprising gallery of characters includes a nineteen-year-old leaving home, a talking gorilla in the swinging sixties, a shoe fetishist and a long distance walker. The prose is lyrical, witty and uplifting, moving and always pertinent . . . a seriously fresh original talent.

She has a son, two daughters and a granddaughter, and is married to the writer Laurence Scott.

== Bibliography ==
Prizes and Awards

- The Complete Companion 1st Prize The Hay-on Wye Short Story Prize 2009
- Arts Council Award 2005
- Ride 3rd Prize Bridport Prize 2001
- Lost Boys Asham Award 2001
- Cumulonimbus 1st Prize London Writers Competition 1992
- It Feels Like This 1st Prize London Writers Competition 1991
- Two Tickets For Wembley 3rd Prize Over21 Magazine Short Story Competition 1988
- A Week In Snow 1st Prize London Writers Competition 1987

Books

- Essential Kit (Maia Press 2004) ISBN 1-904559-10-7
- Glad to Wear Glasses, poems by John Hegley, illustrated by Linda Leatherbarrow (Andre Deutsche 1990) ISBN 978-0-233-05035-5
- Visions of the Bone Idol (Little Bird Press 1984) Poems by John Hegley, illustrations by Linda Leatherbarrow.

Short Stories in Anthologies

- The Complete Companion Stories of Loss and Deception (Hay-on-Wye Short Story Competition Anthology 2010)
- Ride Tapestry (Cappelen, Norway 2003) ISBN 82-02-21004-6
- Lost Boys Harlot Red: Prize Winning Short Stories by Women (Serpent's Tail 2002) ISBN 1-85242-815-5
- Ride and The Student Even the Ants Have Names (Diamond Twig 2002 ISBN 0-9539196-3-3
- Ride The Bridport Prize Anthology (Sansom and Company 2001) ISBN 1-900178-29-X
- La Luna The Nerve (Virago 1998) ISBN 1-86049-575-3
- Beating Back the Dark Signals 2 (London Magazine Publications 1999) ISBN 0-904388-81-6
- Yellow Bear Sleeping Rough: Stories of the Night (Heinemann 1992) ISBN 0-413-45401-0
- Gorilla British Council: New Writing 8 (Vintage 1999) ISBN 0-09-954571-3

Short Stories in Magazines and Journals

- Between the Lines The Christmas Fox 3 (Slightly Foxed - Winter 2010) ISBN 978-1-906562-22-9
- Rehearsal (Sunday Express Magazine - 24/1/2010)
- Crime in a Fairy Tale Forest (Matter Issue No 4 - 2004) ISBN 0-9543150-2-2
- Shush (Mslexia Issue 16 - 2003) ISSN 1473-9399
- Essential Kit (Sunday Express Magazine - 15/12/2002)
- And Is There Honey Still For Tea? (Ambit Issue 132 - 1993) ISSN 0002-6972
- Funny Things Families (Cosmopolitan - June 1989)
- Gorilla (Ambit Issue 153 - 1998) ISSN 0002-6972
- Day Trip (Writing Women Volume 5: Number 3)

Articles and reviews

- 'Dear Jansson San' A review of A Winter Book: Selected Stories by Tove Jansson (Slightly Foxed 40 - Winter 2013) ISBN 978-1-906562-57-1
- 'Not Swinging, Just Dancing' A review of The Country Girls by Edna O'Brien. (Slightly Foxed 35 - Autumn 2012) ISBN 978-1-906562-41-0
- 'The King's Spaniel' A review of Restoration by Rose Tremain. (Slightly Foxed 31 Autumn 2011) ISBN 978-1-906562-29-8
- An Interview with Rose Tremain (Newbooks -Issue 61 Jan/Feb 2011) ISSN 1742-3821
- An Interview with Catherine O'Flynn (Newbooks - Issue 58 Jul/Aug 2010) ISSN 1742-3821
- 'Sunsets and Suburbia' A review of The Atmospheric Railway: New and Selected Stories by Shena MacKay (Slightly Foxed 26 - Summer 2010) ISBN 978-1906562-17-5
- An Interview with Lisa Jewell and Reina James (Newbooks - Issue 56 Mar/Apr 2010) ISSN 1742-3821
- An Interview with Audrey Niffenegger (Newbooks -Issue 54 Nov/Dec 2009) ISSN 1742-3821
- An Interview with Sarah Dunant (Newbooks - Issue 52 Jul/Aug 2009 ISSN 1742-3821
- 'Do You Mind Me Just Asking?' An article on The Paris Review (Slightly Foxed 20 Winter 2008) 2008 ISBN 978-1-906562-05-2
- An Interview with Susan Hill (Newbooks - Issue 47 Sep/Oct 2008) ISSN 1742-3821
- 'How Not To Be A Grandmother' Article and Preface for reissue of My Grandmothers and I by Diana Holman-Hunt (Slightly Foxed 18 Summer 2008) ISBN 978-1-906562-01-4
- 'A Rum Do' A review of The Ascent of Rum Doodle by W. E. Bowman (Slightly Foxed 14 Summer 2007) ISBN 978-0-9551987-6-2
- An Interview with Kate Mosse (Newbooks - Issue 46 Jul/Aug 2008) ISSN 1742-3821
- 'Hooked' A review of Trout Fishing in America by Richard Brautigan (Slightly Foxed 10 Summer 2006) ISBN 978-0-9551987-1-7
- 'Distant Harmonies' A review of The Music at Long Verney: Twenty Stories by Sylvia Townsend Warner (Slightly Foxed 3 Autumn 2004) ISBN 978-0-9548268-2-6

Poems

- My Carpet From John Lewis (Brittle Star - Issue 24 2009)
- Somewhere To Keep My Clothes (Magma - Issue 44 2009)
- Patience (London Magazine -October/November 2008) ISSN 0024-6085
- Parents (Other Poetry Series 3 No.3 2008) ISSN 0144-5847
