= Hamish Kippen =

Northern-Irish born Canadian fashion photographer and former athlete (1987-2008)

- Born: 17 May 1987; Belfast, Northern Ireland
- Died: 21 October 2008 (aged 21); Toronto, Ontario, Canada
- Occupation: Photographer
- Parent(s): James Kippen and Annette Sanger

Hamish Kippen (17 May 1987 – 21 October 2008) was a Canadian fashion photographer and former national and international junior athlete. Born in Belfast, he emigrated with his parents and sisters Alice and Mairi to Toronto, Ontario, Canada, on 19 December 1989. Educated at Jackman Junior Public School, Duke of Connaught Middle School, Danforth Collegiate and Technical Institute, and finally the Image Arts program at Ryerson University (now Toronto Metropolitan University) between 2005 and 2007.

Following gymnastics training as a young child, Hamish turned to platform and springboard diving in his teenage years, first becoming Ontario provincial champion and then Canadian national champion. He represented Canada in many competitions, including the Junior Pan American Games in Mexico City in 2001 and two FINA Junior World Championships (2002 in Aachen, Germany; 2004 in Belém, Brazil). He retired from competitive diving in 2005.

Kippen left Ryerson to pursue a career as a freelance fashion photographer after he won Flare magazine's Communications Award in 2007. He became a regular contributor to Flare, and shot for many other fashion magazines including Clin d'œil, Noi.se magazine, Wedding Bells, Zink, and the online magazine Cheek. He was in great demand for his work with new models, and he was widely recognized to be one of the most promising photographers of his generation.

Kippen unfortunately was suffering from depression. He killed himself during the night of October 20–21, 2008. A book featuring his photography was published in 2009, and the first exhibition of his work appeared in Toronto throughout October 2009.
