= Isobel Agnes Arbuthnot =

Irish botanist and botanical collector (1870–1963)

- Born: 1870; Belfast, Ireland
- Died: 1963 (aged 92–93); Newlands, Cape Provence, South Africa

Isobel Agnes Arbuthnot (1870–1963) was an Irish-born botanist and botanical collector based in South Africa.

== Biography ==
Arbuthnot was born in Belfast in 1870 and went to Cape Colony in 1888 for her health where she took a position as companion to the wife of Harry Bolus. There she also worked as a botanical collector and the botanical assistant on Bolus's expeditions. From 1918 until 1939 she worked in the Bolus Herbarium before moving to the Compton Herbarium, located in the Kirstenbosch National Botanical Garden. She finally retired in 1945.

She married Alex Arbuthnot and worked on the family's dairy farm. In addition to her botanical activities, she was active in the community as chair of the Nambrok School Committee, chair of the Sale District School Committee and, with fellow dairy farmers, she started a Macalister Dairy Ladies Group. In the meantime, she managed the family and the 400–500 cow dairy farm. Also active in politics, in 2006, Isobel received an honorary life membership for her distinguished service to the National Party of Australia.

She died in Newlands, Cape Provence, South Africa in 1963.

The plant Lampranthus arbuthnotiae, a succulent, is named after her.
