= Tom Armstrong (footballer) =

Northern Irish footballer

Personal information
- Full name: Thomas Armstrong
- Date of birth: 4 April 1954 (age 72)
- Place of birth: Belfast, Northern Ireland
- Position: Forward

Senior career*
Years	Team	Apps	(Gls)
1979	San Diego Sockers	9	(2)
1979–1980	San Jose Earthquakes	19	(4)
- * Club domestic league appearances and goals

Tom Armstrong (born 4 April 1954) is a Northern Irish former footballer.

== Playing career ==
Armstrong scored 21 goals for Ards during the 1978–79 Irish League.

=== San Diego Sockers ===
Signing for the San Diego Sockers in 1979, Armstrong expressed gratefulness in escaping the then unsubsiding Northern Irish civil war.
