= Hector Heathwood =

Hector Heathwood (born 1957 in Belfast, Northern Ireland) is a photographer of erotica, fetish and burlesque.
