= Catoan =

Northern Irish progressive folk rock band

catoan
- Catoan in 2007

Background information
- Origin: Belfast, Northern Ireland
- Genres: Folk rock, progressive folk
- Years active: 2006–2008
- Label: Curious Incident Records
- Members: Paddy McKeown; Rúaidhrí Mannion; John Ferris; Cavan Fyans; Rob Baker
- Website: www.catoan.com

catoan (usually all lower case) was a Northern Irish progressive folk rock band, formed in Belfast in 2006 by singer, songwriter, and guitarist Paddy McKeown. The other band members were violinist Rúaidhrí Mannion, electric guitarist John Ferris, bassist Cavan Fyans and drummer Rob Baker. The band were frequently accompanied by saxophonist, Iain McDougall. The band name was conjured up by Rúaidhrí Mannion and allegedly came from an acronym of sorts although some mystery still surrounds its origin. catoan announced that the band had split in early 2008 due to "various circumstances".

== History ==
=== Formation ===
Paddy McKeown had been performing as a solo artist for a number of years in England and had a brief stint in NYC before returning to his native Belfast where he formed catoan.

The band started out primarily as a backing band and Paddy continued to be promoted as a solo artist receiving great critical acclaim and even getting featured on the MySpace homepage for two weeks in August 2006. Then, in March 2007, the band announced the change to become catoan. McKeown has stated that he had never intended to be a solo artist and had been building a career as such due to not having found the right band dynamic. As soon as it became apparent that the members of the Paddy McKeown band were set to stick around, and because the unit functioned as a band anyway, the name change was a natural move.

=== Radio ===
catoan have done a number of sessions for various radio stations including BBC Radio Ulster's Across The Line, Dublin's Phantom FM and Cork's 96FM. catoan gained airplay on BBC Radio 1 in March and again in September 2007 bringing their new name to a much wider audience and helping secure them as one of the more prominent bands of Northern Ireland. The band continued to get airplay on NI stations such as U105fm, Radio Foyle and Radio Ulster.

=== Print media ===
The band both as Paddy McKeown (and band) and as catoan have received positive coverage both locally and nationally through magazines and papers such as AU Magazine, Hotpress, The Belfast Telegraph, The Big List and The Belfast Beat, as well as websites such as Culture Northern Ireland, Drowned In Sound and the BBC's Across The Line.

=== Best of Rising Irish Talent ===
After having been selected to perform on the Belfast leg of the IMRO showcase tour the band found their track, "Stranger" on an IMRO compilation CD entitled, The Best of Rising Irish Talent, which went out with the Irish Daily Star to its 500,000 readership across Ireland on 21 April 2007, helping them gain national recognition.

=== Performances ===
The band regularly perform around their native Belfast having played such venues as The Empire Music Hall, Laverys, The Pavilion, The Black Box, Auntie Annies, The Limelight and Spring and Airbrake.

catoan embarked on their first national Irish tour in August 2007.

Members of the band have done pared down acoustic performances as support for Jack L and Kate Nash.

=== The End ===
In May 2008, catoan announced that they had decided to split.

Ruaidhri, Cavan and John announced the beginning of a new project, The Summer Experiment, in July 2008. The project ran for two years and featured collaborations with renowned photographer Graham Smith, Ponydance Contemporary Dance company, guitarist Ricky Graham and other celebrated artists from Northern Ireland.

Violinist, Ruaidhri Mannion now lives and works in London where he is a composer and performer, completing a Doctor of Music degree at the Royal College of Music.

Shortly after catoan disbanded Rob Baker vanished but has since been spotted several times on moose safari and another occasion dog sledging far above the arctic circle in Northern Norway. He is rumoured to reside in Oslo.

=== TV/Film ===
catoan's, "i will (find you)", has been used as the track for the final scene and end credits of the DVD release of Skins, season 3, episode 8.

== Discography ==
- and will i – released on Curious Incident Records in Ireland on 10 August 2007 and in the UK on 19 October 2007.
