= Seaneen Molloy =

Seaneen Molloy-Vaughan
- Born: Belfast, Northern Ireland
- Occupations: Blogger, columnist
- Writing career
- Period: 2007–present
- Subject: Mental Health

Seaneen Molloy is a Northern Irish blogger and activist based in Belfast.

== Background ==
Molloy grew up in the Twinbrook and Poleglass areas of West Belfast.

Molloy is a columnist for BBC Ouch!, the BBC disability website. She is also a regular contributor to One in Four magazine, and has written for The Guardian and The Observer. Her blog, the Secret Life of a Manic Depressive, was adapted for BBC Radio 4 under the title, Dos and Don'ts for the Mentally Interesting. The play won the award for Best Radio Drama at the 2009 Mind Mental Health Media Awards.

In October 2010, Molloy participated in a comedy show at the Brighton Comedy Festival as part of the Warning: May Contain Nuts project. Warning: May Contain Nuts won gold at the Sony Radio Awards in May 2011. Since 2016, she has been contributing to BuzzFeed and since 2020 she has cohosted the Mentally Interesting podcast on BBC Ouch.

== Personal life ==
She married Robert Vaughan in 2012.
