= Elsie Garrett Rice =

British-born South African botanical artist

Elsie Garrett

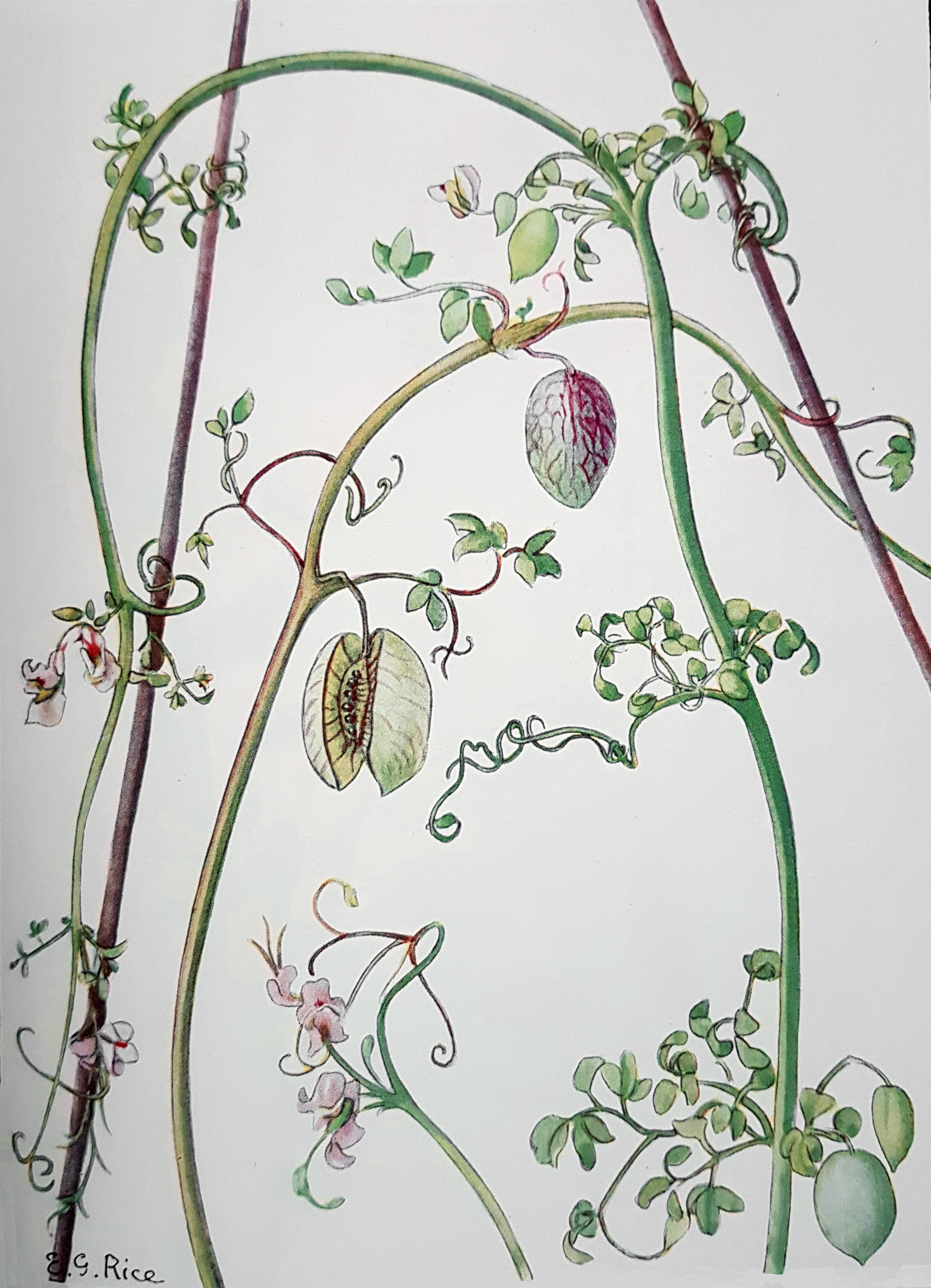
Cysticapnos vesicaria from 'Wild Flowers of The Cape of Good Hope'

Elsie Garrett Rice (25 November 1869 Elton, Derbyshire - 27 April 1959 Cape Town was a British-born South African botanical artist and suffragist.

== Early life and education ==
Elsie Garret Rice's parents were Mary Gray and Reverend John Feydell Garrett. Elsie and her twin brother John Herbert Garrett were baptised at Elton on 16 January 1870. She and her three siblings, John, Edmund and Amy, were orphaned at an early age and were raised by two of their cousins, sisters Millicent Fawcett and Agnes Garrett. Millicent was a leader in the British Suffragist Movement and was married to Sir Henry Fawcett, sometime Postmaster-General, who had been blinded in a hunting accident. Agnes Garrett was also a suffragist, an interior designer and founder of the Ladies Dwellings Company.

Elsie Garret studied at the Slade School of Art and in Florence.

== Career ==
Elsie Garret taught at Bedales School, which had been founded by her brother-in-law John Badley. At Bedales she met her future husband, Charles Emmanuel Rice, headmaster of King Alfred School, Hampstead. In 1901 she was living with her husband and one son and one daughter in Hampstead. By 1911, Elsie, was a 41-year-old art teacher and living at Steep, Hampshire with her 45-year-old husband and two children, Gabriel Edmund 11 and Agnes Rosemary 10, both born at Hampstead. Charles Rice qualified as a physician in 1918.

Elsie became estranged from her husband and moved to South Africa in 1933, at first living in Rondebosch and later moving to Camps Bay with her daughter Rosemary Agnes Hawthorne and son-in-law Dr Charles Barnard Hawthorne, who had married in Coventry in 1923, and followed Elsie to the Cape in 1934. Elsie's grandson was actor Nigel Hawthorne.

== Art ==
She started painting wild flowers and later illustrated Robert Harold Compton's 'Wild Flowers of The Cape of Good Hope' which was published in 1951. She also illustrated Harry Hall's book 'Common Succulents' (Longmans, London, 1955)
