= Ceara Grehan =

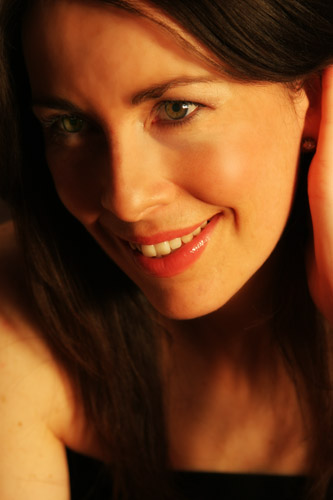
- Grehan in 2006

Background information
- Also known as: Ceara Gallagher
- Born: Ceara Grehan; Belfast, Northern Ireland
- Genres: Opera, theatrical, classical, jazz, folk
- Occupations: Singer, actress

Ceara Grehan (born in Belfast, Northern Ireland) is a theatre and opera singer. She was initially trained at the Belfast School of Music, and with Laura Sarti plus one of London's top West End vocal coaches, Mary Hammond.

Her prolific career has included many productions throughout Ireland and the UK, a regular performer for the Fortwilliam Musical Society, Lyric Opera Productions, and St Agnes Choral Society.

In June 2003, Ceara won the AIMS Award for the Best Female Singer for her part as Anna Leonowens in St. Agnes’ The King and I.

== Career ==
In 2002, Grehan performed at the Odyssey Belfast for "One Enchanted Evening," alongside Peter Corry, Brian Kennedy, Joanna Ampil (Les Misérables, Miss Saigon, Jesus Christ Superstar), and Jeff Leyton (Les Misérables). She has also performed at the Waterford Festival, Lyric Opera Productions with A Tribute to Oscar Hammerstein II at the National Concert Hall in Dublin, and Classics from Broadway. She has performed Cosi Fan Tutti, Tosca, and Il Trovatore with Opera Northern Ireland.

Her roles have included:

- Anna in The Sound of Music at the Dublin National Concert Hall (2012)
- Prince Orlovsky in Die Fledermaus
- Ado Annie in Oklahoma
- Tessa in The Gondoliers
- Pitti Sing in The Mikado (2007)

=== The Leading Ladies ===
In 2004 Ceara formed the Leading Ladies with Lynne McAllister, Michelle Baird, and Mairead Healy. Having previously met through the Northern Ireland Musical Societies, they joined together to perform a diverse range of songs from jazz to opera. The Belfast Telegraph called them "four of the most talented female singers to emerge from the local scene."

== In the media ==
Belfast Mezzo Ceara Grehan was described as having "looked and sounded beautiful. Her show stopping personality as well as her voice ought to lead to much greater national recognition”

Louis McConnell of the Belfast Telegraph writes “Huge local talent in the form of Ceara Grehan. What a superb voice and what a magnificent stage presence to top it off.”

Damien Murray of the Irish News writes “The excellent Ceara Grehan – a lady who could brighten up any West End stage, once again proves her amazing versatility”

Alf McCreary of the Belfast Telegraph writes “It was the professionals who shone musically and none more so than the attractive and talented Ceara Grehan.”

== Awards ==
After being nominated twice, in 2003 she won the Association of Irish Musical Societies award, Best Female Singer, for the role of Anna in “The King and I".

She won a bursary from Opera Northern Ireland.
