= Samuel Martin Stephenson =

Irish presbyterian minister and physician

- Born: 1742; Straidballymorris, Templepatrick, Ireland
- Died: 13 January 1833 (aged 90–91)
- Occupations: Presbyterian minister and physician

Samuel Martin Stephenson (1742 – 13 January 1833) was an Irish presbyterian minister and medical doctor.

== Biography ==
Stephenson was the youngest son of James Stephenson, by his wife Margaret (Martin), was born in 1742 at Straidballymorris, parish of Templepatrick, County Antrim. From the school of John Rankin, presbyterian minister at Antrim, he went to Glasgow University, where he was a pupil of William Leechman. After being licensed in 1767 by Templepatrick presbytery he became master in the diocesan school at Monaghan, where for two years he lodged with Braddock, an apothecary. This gave him a taste for medicine, which he studied in Dublin and in Edinburgh (1773–6).

=== Clerical career ===
In August 1773, he received a call from the congregation of Greyabbey, County Down. His trial sermon, preached on 19 April 1774, was of doubtful orthodoxy, and he declined to subscribe the Westminster Confession of Faith. By a majority of one he was admitted on 31 May to ordination, and ordained by Bangor presbytery on 21 June (the date, 20 June, in report to synod, is wrong) 1774, reading a written declaration of his faith.

On 12 June 1776 he graduated M.D. at Edinburgh, and practised gratuitously at Greyabbey, where his salary was 50l. besides regium donum. On 1 Aug. 1785 he resigned his clerical post, and was succeeded by James Porter. After this date, he moved to Belfast and worked full-time as a doctor; he made a point of treating ministers and their families without charging a fee.

=== Later years ===
Settling as a physician in Belfast, he obtained great distinction in his profession, revolutionising the treatment of fever cases. He founded, in conjunction with James McDonnell, M.D., the dispensary in 1792 and the fever hospital in 1797. Within three months of opening the hospital, McDonnell and his housekeeping, medical and surgical staff all contracted typhus, and hospital services were temporarily suspended. Fortunately he recovered, and ultimately became the most prominent doctor in Belfast where he also founded the Medical Society and the School of Medicine.

He was also a zealous promoter of the (now Royal) Academical Institution which was opened 1 Feb. 1814.

Between 1814 and 1828 he was president and vice-president of the Linen Hall Library in Belfast.

In recognition of his high character for public spirit and private charity, the general synod of Ulster in 1818 replaced his name on the ministerial roll, though he had exercised no clerical duties for over thirty years.

In 1821 he resigned his public appointments in favour of his son, Robert Stephenson, M.D. (died 1869) and devoted his time to amateur archaeology.

He died on 13 January 1833.

== Family ==
He married Mary Armstrong, daughter of Rev James Armstrong. Three of his sons (Samuel, George and Robert) became doctors.

== Publications ==
He published:

- ‘The Declaration of Faith,’ Belfast, 1774, 8vo; 2 edits. same year; reprinted, with title ‘Of Articles of Faith,’ [1822?], 8vo.
- ‘A Review of the Reasons … and … Remarks upon a late Declaration of Faith,’ Belfast, 1775, 8vo.
- ‘De Typho,’ Edinburgh, 1776, 8vo (graduation thesis).
- ‘On the Linen and Hempen Manufactures of … Ulster,’ Belfast, 1808, 4to.
- ‘An Historical Essay on the Parish … of Templepatrick,’ Belfast, 1825, 8vo.
- ‘An Historical Essay on the Parish … of Greyabbey,’ Belfast, 1828, 8vo.
