= Robert Harold Compton =

South African botanist (1886 - 1979)

- Born: August 6, 1886; Tewkesbury, England
- Died: July 11, 1979 (aged 92); South Africa
- Scientific career
- Fields: Botany

Robert Harold Compton (6 August 1886 in Tewkesbury – 11 July 1979 in Cape Town) was a South African botanist. The Compton Herbarium at Kirstenbosch National Botanical Garden, which he founded in Cape Town in 1939, was named in his honour.

== Career ==

He attended Cambridge University from 1905 to 1909, attaining a double first class and distinction and later an M.A. He stayed on at Cambridge from 1911 to 1913 as a Demonstrator in Botany, and joined a field expedition to New Caledonia in 1914, collecting extensively and discovering some new genera and species. While at Cambridge, his main publications were in the area of anatomy and morphology of Gymnosperms, Pteridophytes and Angiosperm seedlings. He enlisted for war service from 1915 to 1918 and arrived in South Africa in March 1919 to become Director of the National Botanic Gardens at Kirstenbosch. At the same time he took up the chair of Harold Pearson Professor of Botany at the University of Cape Town - Harold Pearson was the first Director of Kirstenbosch. Robert Compton held these posts for the next 34 years.

In South Africa his interests were confined to the taxonomy of South African flora. Most of his publications in this field were in the Journal of South African Botany, a journal which he started in 1935 and edited until his retirement.

On retirement in 1953 he chose to settle in Swaziland and was commissioned by the Swazi Government to undertake a botanical survey of the country. The results first appeared as An Annotated Checklist of the Flora of Swaziland in Journal of South African Botany Suppl. 11 (1976)

=== Honours and awards ===
He was President of the SA Association for the Advancement of Science in 1957, receiving their medal and a grant. He was a Fellow of the Royal Society of SA, an Hon. Fellow of the Royal Horticultural Society and medallist, twice President of the SA Museums Association, and received an honorary D.Sc. from the University of Cape Town in 1968.

He is commemorated in Comptonella Bak.f., Comptonanthus B. Nord, and numerous species names. Most of his New Caledonia specimens are with the British Museum, and his vast South African collection (over 35 000 specimens) is spread between the various herbaria in South Africa.

=== Publications ===
- Wild Flowers of the Cape of Good Hope. Botanical Society of South Africa. 1954. with Elsie Garrett Rice
- Kirstenbosch: garden for a nation: being the story of the first 50 years of the National Botanic Gardens of South Africa, 1913-1963. Tafelberg. 1965.
- 'An annotated check list of the flora of Swaziland. National Botanic Gardens of South Africa. 1966.
- Our South African flora (Cape Times, Cape Town 1930s)

== See also ==
- Kirstenbosch National Botanical Garden
- Category:Taxa named by Robert Harold Compton
