= Elizabeth Mincoff-Marriage =

British philologist, folklorist and folk-song collector (1874–1952)

- Born: Mary Elizabeth Marriage; 20 October 1874; Wanstead, Essex, England
- Died: 21 June 1952 (aged 77); Princess Beatrice Hospital, London, England
- Spouse: Constantin Mincoff (m. 1904; died 1929)
- Children: 2, including Marco Mincoff
- Relatives: Ellen Marriage (sister); Edmund Garrett (brother-in-law)

Academic background
- Education: Newnham College, Cambridge; Heidelberg University
- Thesis: Poetic relationships between humans and the plant and animal world in contemporary folk songs in High German-speaking regions (1898)

Academic work
- Discipline: Philology; Folklore studies

Mary Elizabeth Mincoff-Marriage (née Marriage; 20 October 1874 – 29 August 1952) was a British philologist, folklorist and folk-song collector.

== Biography ==
Mincoff-Marriage was born Mary Elizabeth Marriage on 20 October 1874 in Wanstead, Essex (present-day London) to James Haworth Marriage (1839–1913), a confectionery manufacturer, and Mary Marriage (née Brookfield; 1835–1899). (Note: Also cited as Stratford.) The youngest of four siblings in Quaker family, Marriage was the sister of the translator Ellen Marriage. Educated at The Mount School, Marriage won a place to study Modern and Medieval languages at Newnham College, Cambridge in 1893. Later studying at Heidelberg University, Mincoff-Marriage was awarded her doctorate in 1898.

On 11 February 1904, Marriage married Constantin Mincoff, the then attaché to the Bulgarian Legation, at the Friends meeting house in Wanstead. The couple had two sons, including the scholar Marco Mincoff. Living in Sofia until the mid 1940s, Mincoff-Marriage later returned to London where she died at the Princess Beatrice Hospital on 21 June 1952.

== Publications ==
- Marriage, Elizabeth (1902). Volkslieder aus der badischen Pfalz: gesammelt und mit unterstützung des Grossherzoglich badischen ministeriums der justiz, des kultus und unterrichts. Halle.
- Marriage, Elizabeth; Marriage, Margaret S. (1907). Pillow lace, a practical hand-book. London: John Murray. Reprint under the title Pillow or bobbin lace: technique, patterns, history. New York: Dover Publications. 1987.
- Mincoff, Elizabeth (1945). Bulgarian Folksongs. Sofia: Ministry of Propaganda, National Culture Deptartment.
