= John Badley =

John Badley may refer to:

- John Badley (surgeon) (1783–1870), English surgeon, fellow of the Royal College of Surgeons and medical pioneer
- John Haden Badley (1865–1967), English educator, founder and headmaster of Bedales School
