= F A Meier =

Frederic Alfred Meier (4 February 1887 – 13 February 1954) was a British schoolmaster and headmaster of Bedales School, with a special interest in practical methods of teaching physics.

== Early life and education ==
Meier was born in Bromley, Kent, the son of German immigrant parents Caspar Gottlieb Meier and Frieda Fincke. He was educated at Quernmore School, Bromley, before going to London University where at the age of 19 he gained a BSc in engineering with first class honours. He had a year's practical experience as an engineering apprentice at Yarrow & Company's shipbuilding works on the Thames before going as an Exhibitioner to Trinity College, Cambridge, gaining 1st class in the Maths Tripos Pt 1 and 2nd class in Natural Sciences (Physics) Tripos Pt 2. The rest of his life was spent in the teaching profession.

In 1919 he married Sheena MacKenzie, daughter of a Scottish Presbyterian minister, and they had two daughters. He was known as Alfred to his family and close friends, but to many colleagues (and pupils) he was always Freddy or Freddie.

== Outline of teaching career ==
- 1910 – 1913 Trinity College, Glenalmond: Science and Engineering Master
- 1913 – 1914 Marlborough College, Wiltshire: Science and Mathematics Master
- 1914 – 1935 Rugby School: Assistant Science Master and then Senior Science Master and head of Physics Department
- 1935 – 1946 Bedales School: Headmaster
- 1946 – 1954 University of London Institute of Education: Head of Physical Science Department

== Details of career ==
When he arrived at Rugby in 1914, the First World War had just started, and he was appointed training officer for the school Officers' Training Corps (OTC). It was regarded as important war work, so the War Office would not allow him to enlist.

In 1922 Meier and his wife Sheena were asked to take over the running of The Firs, a 'waiting house' with twelve young boys waiting for vacancies in the main Rugby School Houses. They ran the house until the arrival of their second daughter in 1931.

In 1933 it was suggested to Meier that he might apply for the post of headmaster of Bedales, following the decision by the Founder, J H Badley, to step down after 40 years as head. He was eventually appointed and took up the post in Autumn 1935. The difficult years of the Second World War left him exhausted, and in the spring of 1945, just as the war in Europe was coming to an end, he fell ill with pneumonia. Though he made a rapid recovery, thanks to the newly introduced drug M & B, he decided to retire from Bedales at the end of the following academic year. Writing of Meier's years of headship, HM Schools Inspector Roy Wake wrote: "There are people who have overlooked Freddy Meier, and not realised how considerable his achievement was. Twice over he rescued the school – restoring numbers and financial stability when he first came and again in piloting it through the years of the war".

In 1946 he joined the staff of London Institute of Education as head of the Physical Science Department. He was still working there when in 1954 he died suddenly from a blood clot following a prostate operation.

== Teaching methods and influence ==
Meier believed that physics should be taught not just through theoretical explanation but with practical, preferably hands-on, experiments that demonstrated in a simple and direct way the principles involved. But the necessary apparatus, if available at all, was often expensive and sometimes too delicate for students to use themselves. Meier set about designing and then making his own apparatus, using a variety of cheap readily-available materials and a good deal of ingenuity. He recycled long before it was fashionable to do so. His ideas were already well developed by the time he left Rugby. At Bedales the duties of headmaster left him little time for teaching, though he was able to teach a small 6th form physics class, but he spent what time he could, particularly in the school holidays, further developing teaching apparatus. He became well known in the Science Masters' Association (S.M.A.), of which he was a keen and active member, for his enthusiasm and skill in pursuing this aspect of physics teaching.

At the Institute of Education he had full scope for further developing his ideas and bringing them to a wider audience. In the academic year 1948–49, for example, he gave a presidential address at the Royal Institute to the London Association of Science Teachers, gave two series of lectures for Kent Science teachers and two lectures to the S.M.A., all the lectures being illustrated with experiments, and arranged three exhibitions of apparatus and experiments.

In 1951 he was invited to join a sub-committee of the S.M.A. which was looking into the feasibility of making it possible to use a particular M.K.S system in school science teaching. The sub-committee's report, which was published in 1954 under the title The Teaching of Electricity with special reference to the use of M.K.S units, included a large section on experiments and the making of the necessary apparatus. In his preface, the chairman of the sub-committee wrote: "Above all we owe a great debt of gratitude to the late F.A.Meier, who was responsible for the lion's share of the experiments in this Report. His enthusiasm and boundless energy have brought within the scope of every school laboratory experiments (such as the Lorenz determination) which, although fundamental to the understanding of electricity, had previously been regarded as the perquisite of institutions such as the National Physical Laboratory. For him, a difficulty was merely a challenge, something to be overcome".

Meier's early engineering training and personal DIY skills meant he was well equipped to practise what he preached. But one criticism sometimes levelled at this approach was that not every physics teacher, however sympathetic to his ideas, could be expected to have the necessary handyman skills to carry them out. However, his influence was considerable, and though he died some years before the Nuffield Foundation set up the Nuffield Science Teaching Project in 1962 with the object of modernising education in schools, their emphasis on the need for students to experience science themselves through practical work rather than just reading about it clearly built on his ideas, and a number of his experiments were incorporated into their proposed syllabus.
