= Marco Mincoff =

Bulgarian Shakespeare scholar and professor of English (1909–1987)

- Марко Минков
- Born: 28 July [O.S. 15 July] 1909; Samokov, Kingdom of Bulgaria
- Died: 10 July 1987 (aged 77); Sofia, People's Republic of Bulgaria
- Resting place: Central Sofia Cemetery
- Spouse: Gerda Fredericke Elizabeth Tesche
- Children: 2
- Parents: Constantin Mincoff (father); Elizabeth Mincoff-Marriage (mother)
- Relatives: Ellen Marriage (aunt); Edmund Garrett (uncle)

Academic background
- Education: Sofia University; Humboldt University of Berlin
- Thesis: Die Bedeutungsentwicklung der ags. Ausdrücke für 'Kraft' und 'Macht' (1933)

Marco Constantinov Mincoff (Bulgarian: Марко Константинов Минков; 28 July [O.S. 15 July] 1909 – 10 July 1987) was a Bulgarian Shakespeare scholar and professor of English, specialising in English Renaissance drama.

== Biography ==
Mincoff was born on Samokov, Kingdom of Bulgaria (present-day Bulgaria) on 28 July [O.S. 15 July] 1909 to Constantin Mincoff, a Bulgarian diplomat, and Elizabeth Mincoff-Marriage, a British philologist, folklorist and folk-song collector. Educated at Sidcot School, Mincoff later studied classical languages and literature at Sofia University. Awarded the Humboldt scholarship, Mincoff studied English philology at the Humboldt University of Berlin where he completed his doctoral dissertation in 1933.

From 1951 to 1974, Mincoff was head of the department of English and American studies at the University of Sofia. Over the years, teaching courses in grammar, phonetics, stylistics and the history of English literature, he wrote various textbooks and monographs. However his main subject was English Renaissance drama, on which he wrote numerous articles. His work earned him recognition and he became a member of the editorial boards of Shakespeare Survey, Shakespeare Quarterly, Shakespeare Studies, and a few other learned journals. In 1966 the Shakespeare Institute at the University of Birmingham awarded him an honorary title. A commemorative volume containing some biographical material and facsimile reproductions of twenty five of his papers appeared in 2009 on the occasion of the hundredth year of his birth.

Mincoff was married to Gerda Fredericke Elizabeth Tesche, with whom he had two children. Mincoff died in Sofia on 10 July 1987, and was buried at Central Sofia Cemetery.

== Works ==
- Christopher Marlowe: a study of his development (Sofia, 1937)
- Shakespeare: life & works (in Bulgarian) (1946; 2nd. ed. Sofia: Rollis Press, 1992)
- "Baroque Literature in England". Годишник на Софийския университет. Историко-филологически факултет/ Annuaire de l'Université de Sofia. Faculté Historico-philologique. 43: 1–71. 1947. repr. in Limon, Jerzy; Halio, Jay L., eds. (1993). Shakespeare and his contemporaries: Eastern and Central European Studies. Newark, London and Toronto: University of Delaware Press, Associated University Presses. pp. 11-69 – via Internet Archive.
- An English Grammar (Sofia: Nauka i Izkustvo, 1950)
- English Historical Grammar (Sofia, 1955)
- An Introduction to English Phonetics (1960; 3rd. ed. Sofia: Nauka i Izkustvo, 1973)
- Mincoff, Marco (1967). "Shakespeare, Fletcher and Baroque Tragedy". In Muir, Kenneth (ed.). Shakespeare Survey: An Annual Survey of Shakespearian Study and Production. Cambridge: Cambridge University Press. pp. 1-15 – via Internet Archive.
- Mincoff, Marco (1967). "What Shakespeare Did to Rosalynde". In Halio, Jay L. (ed.). Twentieth Century Interpretations of AS YOU LIKE IT: A Collection of Critical Essays. Englewood Cliffs, N.J.: Prentice Hall. pp. 98-106 – via Internet Archive.
- A Study of Style (1965; 2nd. ed. Sofia: Pleiada, 1998)
- A History of English Literature Parts I and II (1970; 3rd. ed. Sofia: Nauka i Izkustvo, 1998)
- Shakespeare: the first steps (Sofia: Bulgarian Academy of Sciences, 1976)
- Things Supernatural and Causeless: Shakespearean Romance (2nd ed.). Newark, London and Toronto: University of Delaware Press, Associated University Presses. 1992. ISBN 0-87413-456-0 – via Internet Archive.
- Studies in English Renaissance Drama (Sofia University Press, 2009)ISBN 978-954-07-2977-0
