= Rhoda Garrett =

English interior designer and suffragist (1841–1882)

- Born: 28 March 1841; Elton, Derbyshire, England
- Died: 22 November 1882 (aged 41); London, England
- Occupations: Suffragist and interior designer
- Known for: Opened the first interior design company in Britain run by women

Rhoda Garrett (28 March 1841 – 22 November 1882) was an English suffragist and interior designer.

== Early life and education ==
Rhoda Garrett was born on 28 March 1841 in Elton, Derbyshire, on 28 March 1841 to Elizabeth Henry Pillcock and Revd John Fisher Garrett. Her mother died when Garrett was young and her father remarried. His second wife was considered to have "practically turned her predecessor's children out of the house to fend for themselves". Garrett supported herself and her younger brothers and sisters, struggling against poverty and poor health. Rhoda's younger half-sister was Amy Garrett Badley, and her half-brother was Fydell Edmund Garrett. Her second cousins included the sisters and suffrage campaigners Millicent Fawcett and Agnes Garrett and Elizabeth Garrett Anderson the first British woman to qualify as a doctor.

== Career ==
In 1867, Garrett moved to London hoping to train as an architect but it took some time to find anyone willing to offer such an opportunity to women. Garrett and her cousin Agnes Garrett were eventually apprenticed as clerks for eighteen months to London architect John McKean Brydon in 1871. He would later design Elizabeth Garrett Anderson women's hospital on Euston Road, London.

Rhoda and Agnes Garrett opened the first interior design company in Britain to be run by women. R & A Garrett opened in mid 1874, in a flat behind Baker Street station, moving to 2 Gower Street in Bloomsbury mid 1875.

Together the cousins wrote and published Suggestions for House Decoration in 1876, part of the 'Art at Home' series of interior decoration and household taste manuals published by Macmillan under the general editorship of W. J. Loftie. It was illustrated with engravings of furniture and rooms, probably of their own home at Gower Street, which was also their business premises. Examples of furniture designed by the Garretts are at Standen House, including a daybed and footstools, with characteristic wedge-shaped legs. Some of these items of furniture are illustrated in Suggestions for House Decoration. R & A Garrett also decorated the home of Elizabeth Garrett Anderson, Rhoda's cousin, at 4 Upper Berkeley Street in the fashionable West End of London, to which she and her husband Skelton had moved in June 1874.

== Early death ==
Rhoda Garrett died aged only 41 from bronchitis and typhoid fever on 22 November 1882 at her home 2 Gower Street, London which she and her cousin Agnes had shared. Elizabeth Garrett Anderson signed her death certificate. She is buried in the churchyard at Rustington where the cousins had a home.
