= Amy Garrett Badley =

English educator, suffragist, school co-founder (1862–1956)

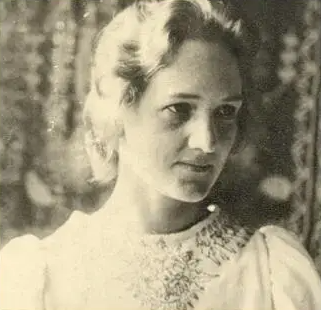
- Born: Mary Amy Garrett; 27 May 1862
- Died: 30 October 1956 (aged 94)
- Education: Frankfurt Conservatoire of Music
- Occupation(s): Educator, suffragist, school founder
- Employer: Bedales School
- Spouse: John Haden Badley
- Children: 1
- Relatives: Rhoda Garrett (half sister); Millicent Fawcett and Elizabeth Garrett Anderson (cousins)

Amy Garrett Badley (née Mary Amy Garrett; 27 May 1862 – 30 October 1956) was an English educator, suffragist, co-founder of Bedales School, and a vice president of the National Council for Equal Citizenship.

== Early life ==
Mary Amy Garrett was born on 27 May 1862, the daughter of Mary Gray and Reverend John Fisher Garrett, and grew up in Elton, Derbyshire. Through her father's first marriage, she was the half sister of suffragist and interior designer Rhoda Garrett. Among her cousins were Millicent Fawcett and Elizabeth Garrett Anderson: a feminist heritage which inspired her. In later life she would speak of being "proud to be a member of a family many of whose members had worked for the same great cause", adding that "she would have been ashamed if she had not tried to follow in their footsteps”.

Her mother, Mary Gray Garrett, died in 1872 at the age of 40; her father died six years later, in 1878.

Garrett studied at the Frankfurt Conservatoire of Music, where she developed a passion for the music of Johann Sebastian Bach, ahead of his widespread popularity in England. Her first teaching position was at Gateshead high school; the 1891 census listed her as a high school mistress in music.

In 1892, Garrett married John Haden Badley, a former classmate of her brother at Trinity College, Cambridge, which whom she had a son. Badley had been working at the progressive Abbotsholme School, run by Cecil Reddie, and despite sharing Reddie's philosophy of education he found him challenging. In 1891, John Haden Badley had sketched out an ideal for his own school, quoting John Locke in addressing "those whose concern for their dear little ones makes them so irregularly bold, that they dare venture to consult their own reason in the education of their children, rather than wholly to rely upon old custom." The couple began to discuss the founding of a school together.

== Bedales School ==
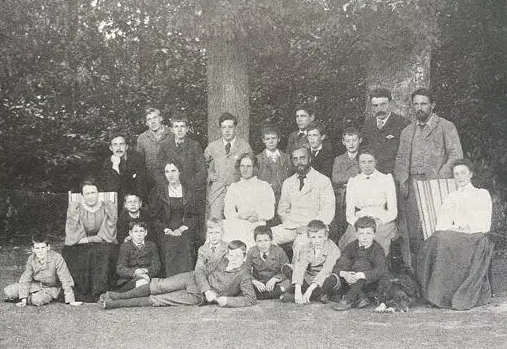
Amy Badley to left of her husband John (in centre), c. 1900

Bedales opened in Lindfield, near Haywards Heath, in January 1893. Girls first joined the school in the Autumn of 1898, due in no small part to "the determination and persistence of Mrs Badley", whose promotion of women's suffrage in the area was well known. This made Bedales the first English boarding school which admitted boys and girls on a fully equal basis. The decision was not without controversy, but John Haden Badley defended the decision as encouraging better relationships between the sexes into adulthood. Amy Badley was known by students of the school as 'Ma B'.

At Bedales, Amy Badley is also said to have contributed "her own musical gifts and an indomitable and active concern for the emancipation of women". Amy Badley was an active supporter of women's suffrage, promoting it within the school as well as outside of it. She helped to found the Petersfield Society for Woman Suffrage and Equal Citizenship, of which she was the "mainstay" for 35 years.

Badley retired in 1934, and moved with her husband to Cholesbury, Buckinghamshire, close to their son's farm.

== Death and legacy ==
Amy Badley died on 30 October 1956 in Buckinghamshire. An obituary in The Times recalled as her as having had "an active share" in the "more important changes" of the era in which she'd lived, such as "the regeneration in this country of music, the reform of education, [and] the liberation of women from medieval and early Victorian limitations".

Today, Bedales School holds a summer community day named "Garrett Day" after Amy Garrett Badley.
