= Ellen Marriage =

English translator (1865–1946)

- Born: 26 August 1865; Stratford, Essex, England
- Died: 23 December 1946 (aged 81); Malvern, Worcestershire, England
- Other name: Ellen Garrett
- Spouse: Fydell Edmund Garrett (m. 1903; died 1907)
- Relatives: Elizabeth Mincoff-Marriage (sister); Marco Mincoff (nephew); Constantin Mincoff (brother-in-law)

Ellen Marriage (married name Garrett; 26 August 1865 – 23 December 1946) was an English translator from French, notably of Balzac's novels.

== Life ==
Marriage was born 23 August 1865 at Stratford, Essex (present-day, London) to James Haworth Marriage (1839–1913), a confectionery manufacturer, and Mary Marriage (née Brookfield; 1835–1899). The eldest of four siblings, Marriage was the sister of the philologist and folklorist and folk-song collector Elizabeth Mincoff-Marriage. Raised in Quaker family, Marriage and her sisters were educated at The Mount School. On leaving she went to work as an invoice clerk, but she was already reading widely in English and French and doing some writing.

Marriage met the English journalist Edmund Garrett (1865–1907) while they were both patients at a Suffolk sanatorium in 1901, he with tuberculosis, she with neurasthenia. They were married on 26 March 1903 and moved first to St Ives, Cornwall, then to Plympton in Devon. Marriage returned to the Home Counties after Garrett's death. In the 1920s she was living in Notting Hill. In the early 1930s, she moved to Malvern, Worcestershire, where she died.

== Translations ==
A. R. Waller, a critic who was a neighbour of the Marriage family, suggested she do translations when he proposed to the London publisher J. M. Dent that his firm embark on the first complete edition of Balzac's immense novel cycle La Comédie humaine. Hitherto only a few of the novels had appeared in the United Kingdom singly. George Saintsbury was appointed editor and work began. Forty volumes duly appeared between 1895 and 1898, although five others were omitted as too shocking for Victorian English tastes. Marriage, under her own name and under the pseudonym James Waring for some of the "bolder works", did most of the translation, except for 13 volumes by Clara Bell and one volume by Rachel Scott.

Marriage earned only about £3–4 a week while she worked on the project, but put an effort into ensuring it was readable and accurate that was unusual for translators in that period. She visited France to check details and researched specialist vocabulary on heraldry and other subjects. However, she found it lonely work, and never undertook another project on this scale. Many of the volumes remained in print for decades in Dent's Everyman's Library. Father Goriot, the Marriage translation of Le Père Goriot, had gone through 54 editions by 2006 and was still held then by 1306 libraries worldwide.

The only other literary works that Marriage translated were Henri Murger's Scènes de la vie de bohème (1901) and Marcel Prévost's Frédérique (1900) and Lea (1902). She prepared her husband's translations of Ibsen's poetry for the press while he was alive. After his death, she revised an earlier translation he had done of Ibsen's verse tragedy Brand.

== Journalism ==
Marriage also wrote for the daily press, often anonymously and mainly on Balkan affairs, helped by the fact that her sister Elizabeth had married a Bulgarian diplomat, Constantin Mincoff. She was related by marriage to Millicent Fawcett and Elizabeth Garrett Anderson, and showed interest in the women's suffrage movement. She did some work for the suffragist newspaper Common Cause.
