= John Badley (surgeon) =

John Badley, F.R.C.S. (23 July 1783 – 16 April 1870) student of John Abernethy at St. Bartholomew's Hospital, London. His 1801 lecture notes of Abernethy are in the archives at the University of Birmingham School of Medicine.

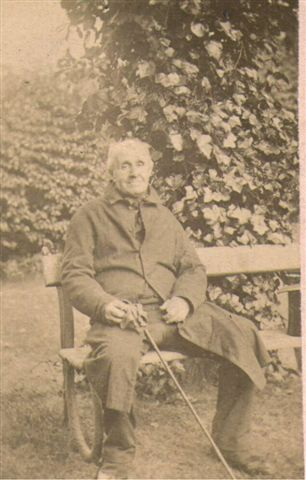
Photograph of John Badley, Surgeon of Dudley taken ca. 1865 unawares by the grandson of a patient

== Life ==
Born in Dudley, Worcestershire, England to a surgeon father, William Badley, of Dudley, and Sarah Cox his wife. He studied medicine at Saint Bartholomew's Hospital in London where he was a favorite pupil of John Abernethy a leading surgeon at the turn of the 18th century and himself a student of Hunter. He was elected as a Fellow and is listed in Plarr's Lives of the Fellows of the Royal College of Surgeons. Despite Abernethy's desire for him to remain in London, his father's poor health and subsequent death caused him to return to Dudley where in 1810 he married his first cousin Mary Fisher Badley.

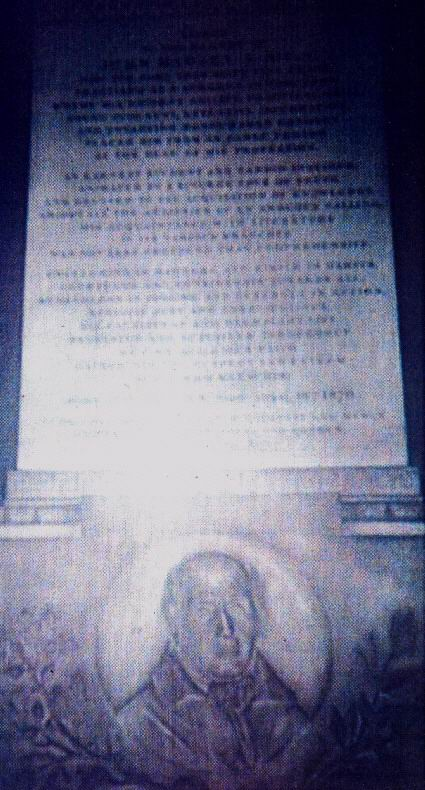
Memorial to John Badley, F.R.C.S. in the nave of Saint Edmund's Church, Dudley.

He was sought after throughout the Midlands during the first half of the 19th century. The likeness to the right was captured "unawares." "He had ridden over one afternoon, towards the end of his life, to see a patient in the county. As he sat resting on a garden seat, one of the younger generations who had some skill in photography seized the opportunity to get by a ruse the photograph for which he knew the old man would not knowingly consent to sit. As though merely to give him a few moments' interest in a youngster's hobby, he brought out his camera and set it up in front of him just to show him how it worked. 'You see, we have to do this, and this, and this,' he said, and having gained the sitter's attention, exposed the plate without letting him guess it was more than an empty demonstration."

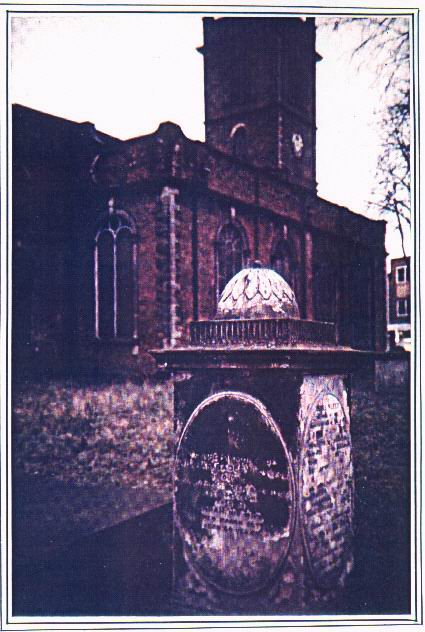
The marker above the Badley family vault at Saint Edmund's Church, Dudley.

They were the parents of eight children. The eldest two sons emigrated to America and fulfilled his desire to know more about the "American experiment." The seventh child, James Payton Badley, remained in England, assumed his father's practice and became the father of John Haden Badley, the centenarian founder of Bedales School, the first coeducational school in England.

He lived a full life devoted to his patients and family and died in Dudley and was buried in his father's vault at St. Edmund's Church where there is also a memorial in the nave of the church. The monument is by Birmingham sculptor Peter Hollins.

== Archives ==
A case book kept by Badley is held at the Cadbury Research Library, University of Birmingham. The volume describes medical cases and surgeries that he witnessed during the early 1800s while working under Abernethy's supervision at St. Bartholomew's Hospital.
