= John Haden Badley =

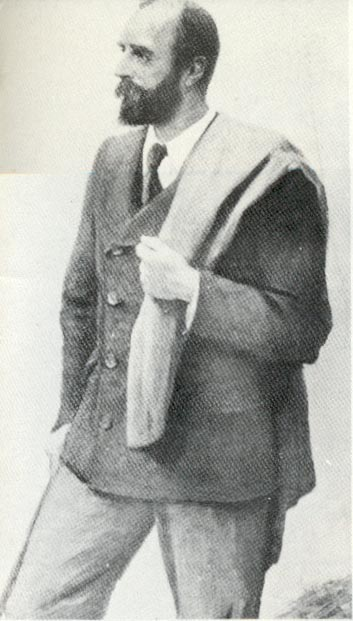
John Haden Badley, at the age of 56, from the painting by Fred Yates

John Haden Badley (21 February 1865 – 6 March 1967) was an English author, educator, and founder of Bedales School, which claims to have become the first coeducational boarding public school in England in 1893.

== Life ==
Born in Dudley, Worcestershire (now West Midlands), England, the son of Dr. James Payton Badley and Laura Elizabeth Best. He was the grandson of John Badley, one of the original 300 fellows of the Royal College of Surgeons. Early in life, he saw the poverty and squalor of many working class people in the Midlands. When fifteen, he entered the Upper School at Rugby.

These early experiences were influential in shaping his ideas of what education should not be. While a student at Trinity College Cambridge, he gained the appreciation of a standard of music and theatre, and he described King's Chapel as providing "a standard of loveliness of trained voices in that architectural setting of something near perfection." His autobiography describes a tea with Oscar Wilde at which they discussed the English Poets. Here, too, his friendship with Edmund Garrett encouraged him to join the small minority of men who supported the women's movement for socio-political equality.

At Cambridge, Badley became a lifelong socialist, influenced by the ideals of William Morris about art and community life. But the decisive influence on the direction these ideas should take was Cecil Reddie, founder of Abbotsholme School and arguably the originator of the 'modern' British progressive school. Graduating from Cambridge with a first class classics degree in 1887, Badley heard about the plans for Reddie's school through his university friend Goldsworthy Lowes Dickinson when he came down in 1888, went there and was fascinated. He was, at age 4, one of the first masters appointed, but it is probable that from the start he had plans to found a school of his own. After two and a half years, Reddie's increasingly autocratic temperament - and the fact that Badley wanted to marry and Reddie said he could not - gave him the impetus to leave and start his own school. He married Amy Garrett, the sister of his Cambridge friend Edmund Garret, in 1892, and in January 1893, with the help of Oswald Powell, they opened their school, Bedales, in a rented property near Haywards Heath. Amy would be a strong partner until her death in 1956, and the drive behind one of Bedales's major innovations, co-education. A school, he felt, should be organized like a family, with willing cooperation for common ends as the main motive rather than on the basis of mere competition. He felt that the training for social usefulness held equal importance with the development of the individual.

=== Startup ===
All Badley's initial ideas ― though their later development was different ― were taken from Reddie. For instance, the curriculum was English-based, not classical, and wide ― with science, art, music, French, German, and opportunities for plays and hobbies. Religion was non-dogmatic and non-sectarian. Boys were not crammed for exams, there were no prizes and lessons were only in the mornings. The games emphasis of Rugby and the conventional Public School was condemned; instead much time was spent on manual labour in fields and gardens, and the boys were also taught tailoring, boot making and cookery. Badley also copied many of the early organisational details, down to the earth closets which enabled him to return to the soil that which had been taken from it. He experimented with different ideas during the 1920s including the Dalton Plan approach to assignments.

He claimed, in his own modesty, to owe much to Montessori, Pestalozzi, Fröbel and Dewey. Helen Parkhurst of the "Dalton Plan" would draw on his experience years later in New York City. In 1898, five years after Bedales was founded, at the insistence of his wife Amy, a suffragist (she was a cousin of Elizabeth Garrett Anderson and Millicent Fawcett), he took the further risk of engaging in a "preposterous experiment" which led to Bedales becoming a fully coeducational boarding school. In May 1899 he started building a new complex which still serves the school today at Steep, Petersfield, Hampshire.

=== Operation ===
Badley was an educationalist, leading through example and great authority. Integral to that persona though was the personal reserve and sexual repression characteristic of the English Public School system, coupled with obsessions of 1890 Sandal Socialism and German Naturkultur: the emphasis on cold baths, earth closets, homespun fabrics, and "unsilly" (i.e. non-sexual) friendship between adolescent boys and girls. He was strict and he was obeyed; he neither smoked nor drank: "When he came stalking with his quick, silent tread, into the classroom there was immediate silence; if there happened to be a piece of paper on the floor, he would point to it without deigning to say a word, and the boy nearest would hurriedly pick it up."

He created an example of the evolving school. His educational outline became a framework to which he would continue to contribute and set outer limits, but then allowed the school to evolve. While he would be called "Chief" for the rest of his life by students and staff alike, he did not dominate as most great headmasters have. At the age of seventy he retired to Cholesbury, near Tring, after being headmaster of his school for 42 years. Cholesbury is some 2 1/2 miles from Spencers Green where the Badleys' son (John Edmund Badley, known as Jock, b 3.10.94) and daughter in law had their farm.

== Death and legacy ==
Badley wrote a number of books in his lifetime which include After the War (1917), Bedales: A Pioneer School (1923), Form and Spirit (1951), and his autobiography, Memories and Reflections, published in 1955, written ten years earlier and given to a friend and colleague for posthumous publication. After the friend died he consented to have it released. Yet it was his last work that can be looked at as his magnum opus: A Bible for Modern Readers (the New Testament) in 1961 and The Bible As Seen Today (the Old Testament) in 1965 together comprise over 1000 pages. After his wife's death in 1956, he returned to live his last years in the School grounds where he died on 6 March 1967.

== Bibliography ==
- Bedales School; A School for Boys. Outline of its aims and system (1892), Cambridge University Press
- Bedales School: Outline of Its Aims and System: An Essay in Education (1912), Cambridge University Press
- Co-education in Practice (1914), Cambridge: Heffer
- Education after the War (1917), Oxford: Blackwell
- School Talks in Peace and War (1920), Oxford: Blackwell.
- Co-education and Its Part in a Complete Education (1920), Cambridge: Heffer
- Notes and suggestions for Those who Join the staff at Bedales School 1922 Cambridge University Press
- Bedales: A Pioneer School (1923), London: Methuen
- The Will to Live: An Outline of Evolutionary Psychology (1931), London: Allen & Unwin
- The Will to Fuller Life (1933), London: Allen & Unwin
- "These Make Men's Lives" (1935), Oxford: Blackwell
- A Schoolmaster's Testament: Forty Years of Educational Experience (1937), Oxford: Blackwell
- Form and Spirit: A Study in Religion (1951), London: Routledge & Kegan Paul
- Memories and Reflections (1955), London: Allen & Unwin
- The Bible as Seen To-day (1965), Reading: Berkshire: Printing Co. (three-volume edition of titles below)
  - A Bible for Modern Readers (and What It Means for Us): The New Testament (1961), London: James Clarke
  - The Bible as Seen To-day: The Old Testament (1965), Reading: Berkshire Printing Co. (2 vols.)
