= Kensington Park School =

Location
- 40-44 Bark Place; Bayswater; London, W2 4AT; England; 51.511272°N 0.189490°W

Information
- Type: Private school
- Established: 1983
- Closed: 20 August 2026
- Department for Education URN: 100536 Tables
- Head teacher: Mr Antony Faccinello
- Gender: Coeducational
- Age: 11 to 20
- Enrolment: 223 (2025)
- Capacity: 604
- Website: www.kps.co.uk

Kensington Park School was a coeducational private day and boarding school located in London, England.

The lower school for pupils aged 11 to 16 is situated in the Bayswater area of the City of Westminster, while the sixth form is located in nearby South Kensington. in 2020 Chelsea Independent College in Fulham formally merged with Kensington Park School.

While the school offers boarding services priced at £25,530 - £36,600, the day school fees are around £29,850 - £31,050 per annum.

The boarding house is in the former Princess Beatrice Hospital building in West Brompton.

== History ==
The school was established in 1983.

On 3 August 2026, the school cancelled its summer courses costing £4000 without issuing refunds due to significant financial stress. The school was placed into creditors voluntary liquidation on 20 August 2026, leading to the closure of the school.
