= Cecil Reddie =

English educationalist

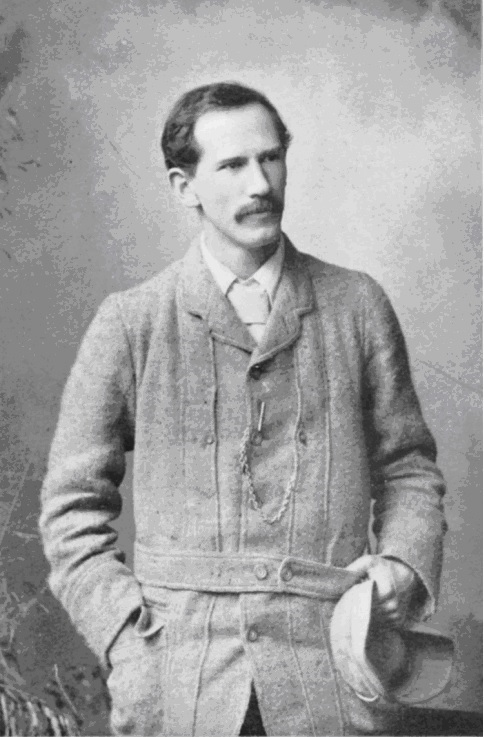
- Dr Cecil Reddie, progressive educationalist and co-founder of Abbotsholme School
- Born: 10 October 1858; Fulham, London, England
- Died: 6 February 1932 (aged 73); London, England
- Occupation: Reforming Educationalist
- Years active: 1884–1927
- Known for: Abbotsholme School
- Relatives: Alexander Philip, Cousin

Dr Cecil Reddie (10 October 1858 – 6 February 1932) was a reforming English educationalist. He founded and was headmaster of the progressive Abbotsholme School.

== Early life ==
He was born in Colehill Lodge, Fulham, London, the sixth of ten children. His parents were James Reddie from Kinross, an Admiralty civil servant and Caroline Susannah Scott. He spent four years at Goldolphin School in London until his parents' deaths. He attended Birkenhead School (1871–1872) as a day-boy and he then was a boarder at Fettes College, Edinburgh (1872–1878). He studied medicine, physics, mathematics and chemistry at Edinburgh University (1878–1882) before obtaining his doctorate in chemistry at Göttingen University (1882–1884).

He had been unhappy at boarding school and was bored by the classical curriculum. While in Göttingen he was greatly impressed by the progressive educational theories being applied there. In 1883 he joined the radical Fellowship of the New Life in England and decided to establish a school for boys based on socialist principles. He agonised over his homosexuality and he sought emotional guidance. He was influenced by fellow teacher Clement Charles Cotterill, polymath Patrick Geddes, the utopian socialists Edward Carpenter and John Ruskin. He rejected corporal punishment and substituted the principles of self-discipline and tutoring. Other influences came from German naturist movement FKK and Walt Whitman who elevated 'the love of comrades' and 'guiltless affection between men' to the level of an ideal of social liberation.

== Abbotsholme ==
He returned to Fettes to teach science and then moved to Clifton College in Bristol until 1888. His clash with the college over his ideas, particularly on sex education caused him to leave after a breakdown in health. Reddie lived with Carpenter from 1888 to 1889 who helped him found Abbotsholme School in Derbyshire in 1889 with the financial support of Robert Muirhead and William Cassels. The school opened with six students. He made the school his life's work. Apart from two years in the US on sick leave (1906–1907), he ran the school until he retired in 1927.

Abbotsholme was never specifically socialist; its curriculum emphasised progressive education. Not only was there intensive study and personal supervision, there was also a programme of physical exercise, manual labour, recreation and arts. Modern languages and sciences were taught. Religious instruction was non-sectarian and covered other religions and philosophies such as Confucianism He ran the first sex education course at a British school. Reddie believed that being close to nature was important and so the boys worked on the estate providing practical experience on raising animals and vegetables, haymaking, digging, wood-chopping and fencing. Pupils were given great freedom to walk in the country. Reddie devised a uniform of comfortable clothes (soft shirt, soft tie, Norfolk-type jacket and knickerbockers) at a time when boys at public schools wore stiff collars and top hats.

There were conflicts with the founders, until Reddie was in sole charge of the school. He bought the other founders out with borrowed money. Among the teachers was John Badley, who was one of the first masters appointed. In 1893, after two and a half years, Reddie's increasingly autocratic temperament – and the fact that Badley wanted to marry and Reddie said he could not – gave Badley the impetus to leave and start Bedales School. Badley said: "Reddie taught me everything I needed to do and what not to do". By 1900 the Abbotsholme had 60 pupils, many from Europe and the British Empire.

He often engaged foreign teachers, who learned its practices before returning home to start their own schools. Abbotsholme was particularly influential in Germany. Hermann Lietz a German educational progressive and theologian, taught at Abbotsholme and founded his five schools (Landerziehungsheime für Jungen) on Abbotsholme's curriculum: modern languages, science, sports and crafts, de-emphasising rote learning and classical languages. Other people he influenced were Kurt Hahn, Adolphe Ferrière and Edmond Demolins.

His personality clashes with strong-minded teachers caused the standards to fall because he started employing 'yes-men', and the numbers dropped to 30 in 1906. He changed his ideals from romantic socialism to a more authoritarian policy. His pro-German attitudes were unpopular during the First World War.

== Final years ==
When he retired in 1927 the number of pupils had dwindled to two from its 1900 peak. He retired to Welwyn Garden City and he died in St Bartholomew's Hospital in February 1932. His successor, Colin Sharp, quickly recovered the situation, though Abbotsholme became a more traditional college.

== Influence ==
Although his fame diminished in England, Cecil Reddie was one of the founders of progressive education throughout the world especially in Europe, Japan and the United States.

== Publications ==
- Cecil Reddie: John Bull: His Origin of Character, London 1901
- Cecil Reddie: Abbotsholme, 1889–1899, or ten years of work in educational laboratory; London 1900
