= Louisa Browning =

British school proprietor

- Born: 17 April 1807; London
- Died: 6 September 1887 (aged 79–80); Haverstock Hill
- Known for: running a school for women's rights activists

Louisa Browning (1807 – 6 September 1887) was a British school proprietor. Her small school had some notable pupils.

== Life ==
Browning was born in 1807 in London. Her father was Robert Browning who would be the grandfather of the poet named Robert Browning when he was born in 1812. Her father had however remarried to Jane Smith and she was his sixth child.

She was her father's fourth daughter and he gave her £200 to set up a school which she did with her sister Sarah and for a while another sister Jemima. Girls could board at her school at 4 Dartmouth Row in Blackheath in London. Among their pupils were the daughters of Newson Garrett and this included two notable girls. Aged twelve in 1858, Millicent (later Millicent Fawcett) and her elder sister Elizabeth (later Elizabeth Garrett Anderson) was sent to London with her sister Elizabeth to attend a private boarding school in Blackheath. They met the head of the school who was large and wore bright colours. Millicent found Louisa Brown to be a "born teacher" whereas her sister remembered the "stupidity" of the teachers. However Millicent was to meet Emily Davies via the school. She met Emily in Gateshead at the house of Sophie and Annie Crow who were two other pupils at the school. Emily Davies was quoted as saying "It is quite clear what has to be done. I must devote myself to securing higher education, while you [Elizabeth must] open the medical profession to women. After these things are done, we must see about getting the vote." She then turned to Millicent: "You are younger than we are, Millie, so you must attend to that."

Millicent was the youngest and by the time she left the school it was under new management. Louisa and Sarah had retired by 1862 to a house together. Browning died in Haverstock Hill in 1887.
