= Princess Beatrice Hospital =

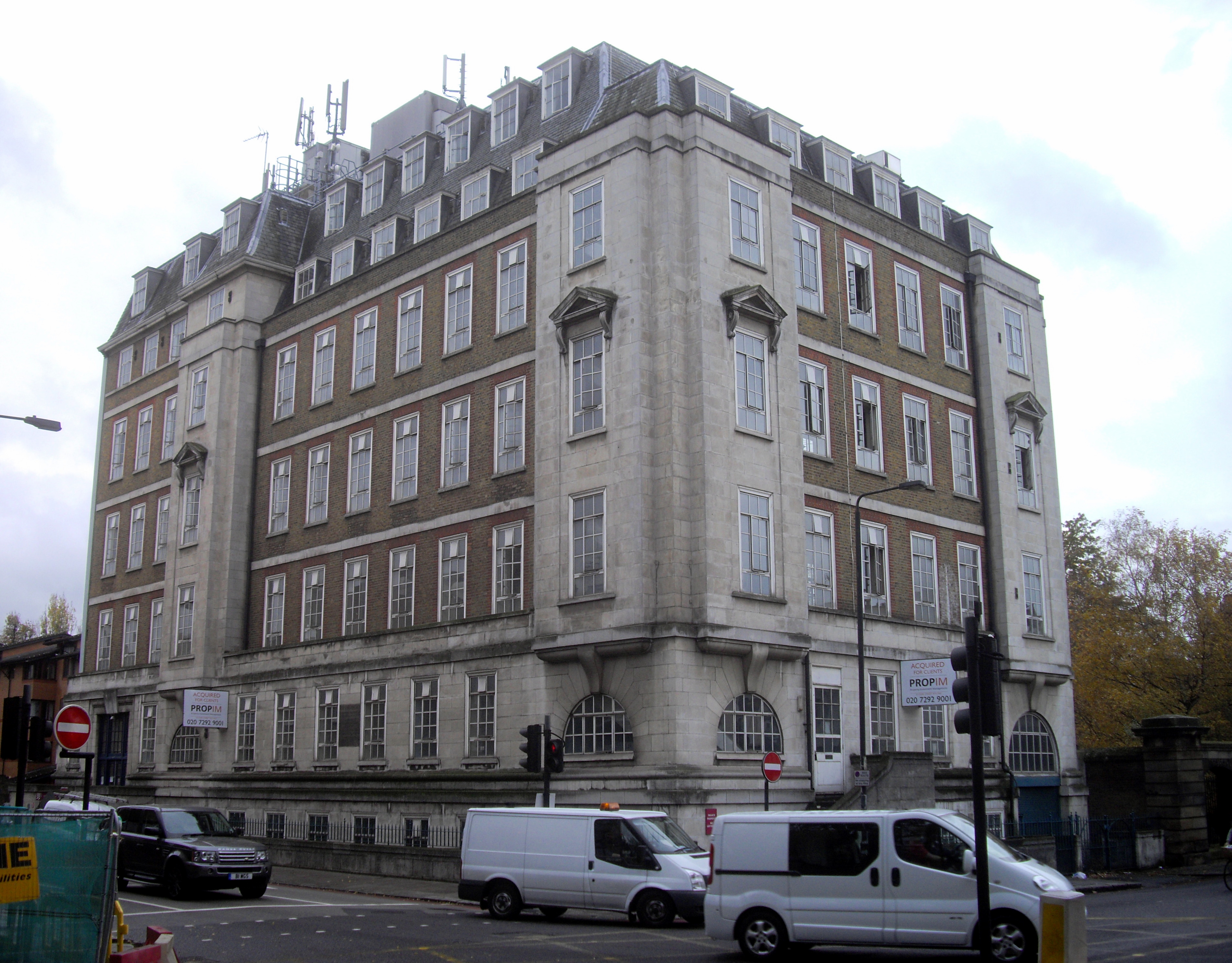
- Former Princess Beatrice Hospital

- Shown in Kensington and Chelsea

Geography
- Location: Earls Court, London, England
- Coordinates: 51.4884°N 0.1925°W

Organisation
- Care system: NHS England
- Type: Specialist

Services
- Speciality: Maternity

History
- Founded: 1887
- Closed: 1978

Links
- Lists: Hospitals in England

The Princess Beatrice Hospital was a London hospital located in Earl's Court, which operated from 1887 to 1978, latterly as a maternity hospital.

== History ==
The hospital was founded in 1887 as part of the celebrations of Queen Victoria’s Golden Jubilee, and originally called the Queen's Jubilee Hospital. It was a small hospital of 14 beds, serving local people in need.

It was renamed several times in the early 20th century:

- 1907 – Kensington General Hospital
- 1909 – Kensington and Fulham General Hospital
- 1921 – Kensington, Fulham and Chelsea Hospital.

In 1930, the hospital was rebuilt by Aston Webb and Son to a design by Maurice Webb, and renamed in honour of Princess Beatrice, who laid the foundation stone. Her son, the Marquess of Carisbrooke, was President of the Hospital. The new hospital had up to 100 beds.

From 1971, it operated as a dedicated maternity hospital. It closed in 1978. It was used as a filming location in the film An American Werewolf in London in 1981.

== Location ==
The hospital was located on corner of the Old Brompton Road and Finborough Road in Earl's Court. The 1887 hospital was based in Walwyn House (formerly called Brecknock Villa), which had been built for John Evan Thomas in 1842. A separate nurses' home was provided on Finborough Road.

As of 2020, the 1930 building is still standing, called Princess Beatrice House: it provides boarding accommodation for Kensington Park School, though the school went into administration in August 2026.

== See also ==
- List of hospitals in England
