= Millicent Fawcett =

English politician, writer, and activist (1847–1929)

Dame Millicent Fawcett GBE
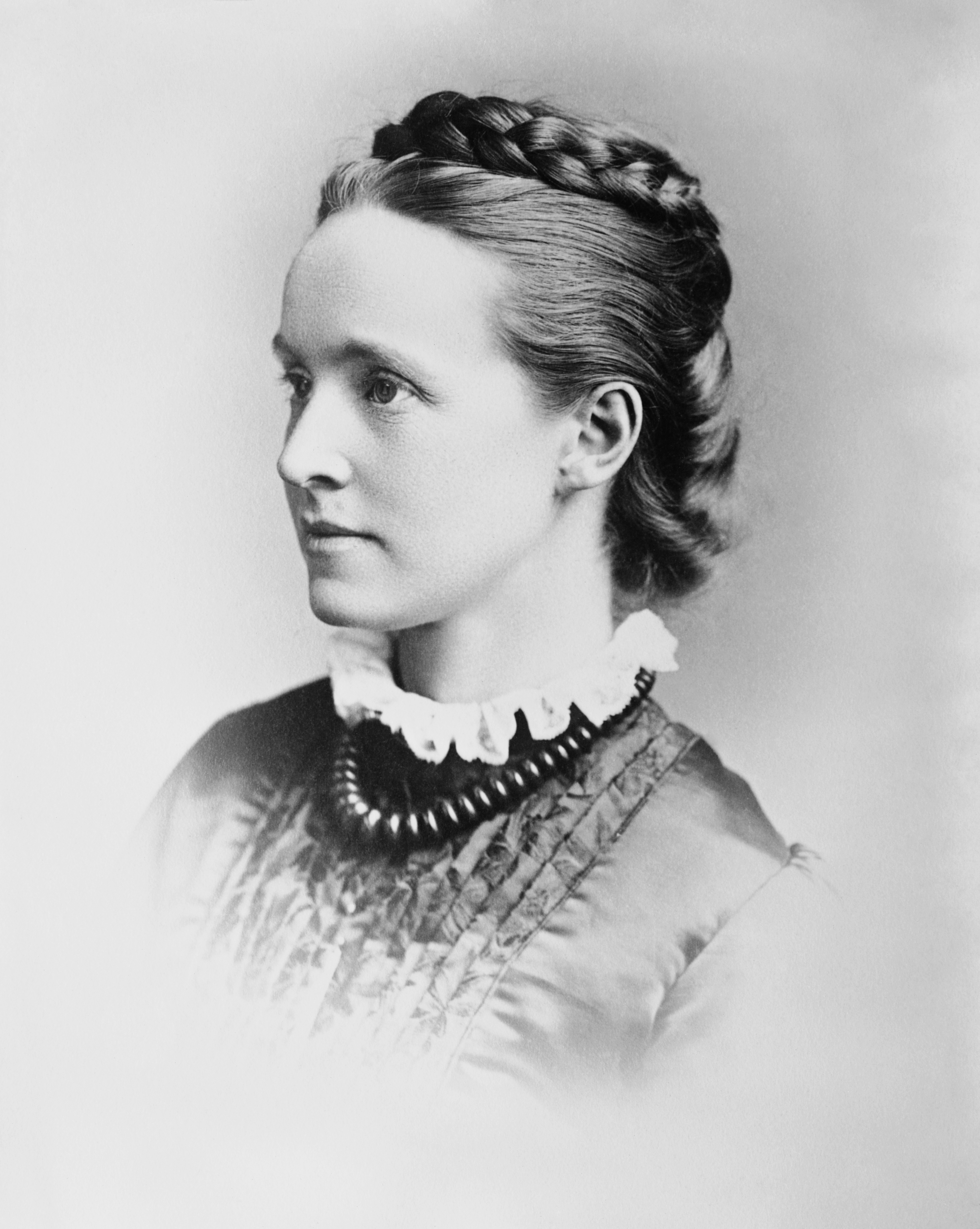
- Fawcett, c. 1873
- Born: Millicent Garrett; 11 June 1847; Aldeburgh, Suffolk, England
- Died: 5 August 1929 (aged 82); Bloomsbury, London, England
- Monuments: Statue of Millicent Fawcett
- Occupations: Suffragist, union leader
- Spouse: Henry Fawcett (m. 1867; died 1884)
- Children: Philippa Fawcett
- Parent(s): Newson Garrett; Louisa Dunnell
- Relatives: Elizabeth Garrett Anderson, Agnes Garrett (sisters); Louisa Garrett Anderson (niece)

Dame Millicent Garrett Fawcett (née Garrett; 11 June 1847 – 5 August 1929) was an English political activist and writer. She campaigned for women's suffrage by legal change and in 1897–1919 led Britain's largest women's rights association, the National Union of Women's Suffrage Societies (NUWSS), explaining, "I cannot say I became a suffragist. I always was one, from the time I was old enough to think at all about the principles of Representative Government." She tried to broaden women's chances of higher education, as a governor of Bedford College, London (now Royal Holloway) and co-founding Newnham College, Cambridge in 1871. In 2018, a century after the Representation of the People Act, she was the first woman honoured by a statue in Parliament Square.

== Biography ==
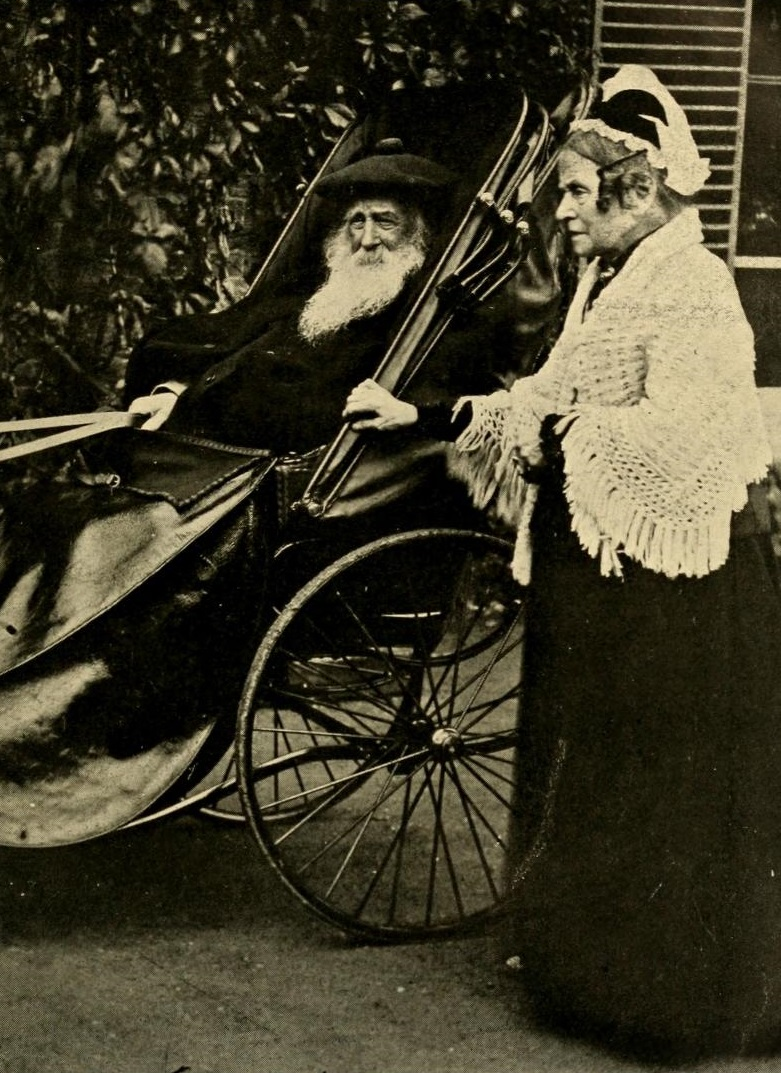
Fawcett's parents, Newson and Louisa Garrett, in their old age

=== Early life ===
Fawcett was born on 11 June 1847 in Aldeburgh, to Newson Garrett (1812–1893), a businessman from nearby Leiston, and his London wife Louisa (née Dunnell, 1813–1903). She was the eighth of their ten children.

According to Ray Strachey, "The Garretts were a close and happy family in which children were encouraged to be physically active, read widely, speak their minds, and share in the political interests of their father, a convert from Conservatism to Gladstonian Liberalism, a combative man, and a keen patriot."

As a child, Fawcett's elder sister Elizabeth Garrett Anderson, who became Britain's first female doctor, introduced her to Emily Davies, an English suffragist. In her mother's biography, Louisa Garrett Anderson quotes Davies as saying to her mother, to Elizabeth and to Fawcett, "It is quite clear what has to be done. I must devote myself to securing higher education, while you open the medical profession to women. After these things are done, we must see about getting the vote." She then turned to Millicent: "You are younger than we are, Millie, so you must attend to that."

Aged twelve in 1858, Millicent Garrett was sent to London with her sister Elizabeth to attend a private boarding school in Blackheath. Millicent found Louisa Browning who led the school to be a "born teacher" whereas her sister remembered the "stupidity" of the teachers. Her sister Louise took her to the sermons of Frederick Denison Maurice, a socially aware and less traditional Anglican priest, whose opinions influenced her view of religion. In 1865, she attended a lecture by John Stuart Mill. The following year, she and a friend, Emily Davies, supported the Kensington Society by collecting signatures for a petition asking Parliament to enfranchise women householders.

=== Marriage, family and the suffrage movement ===
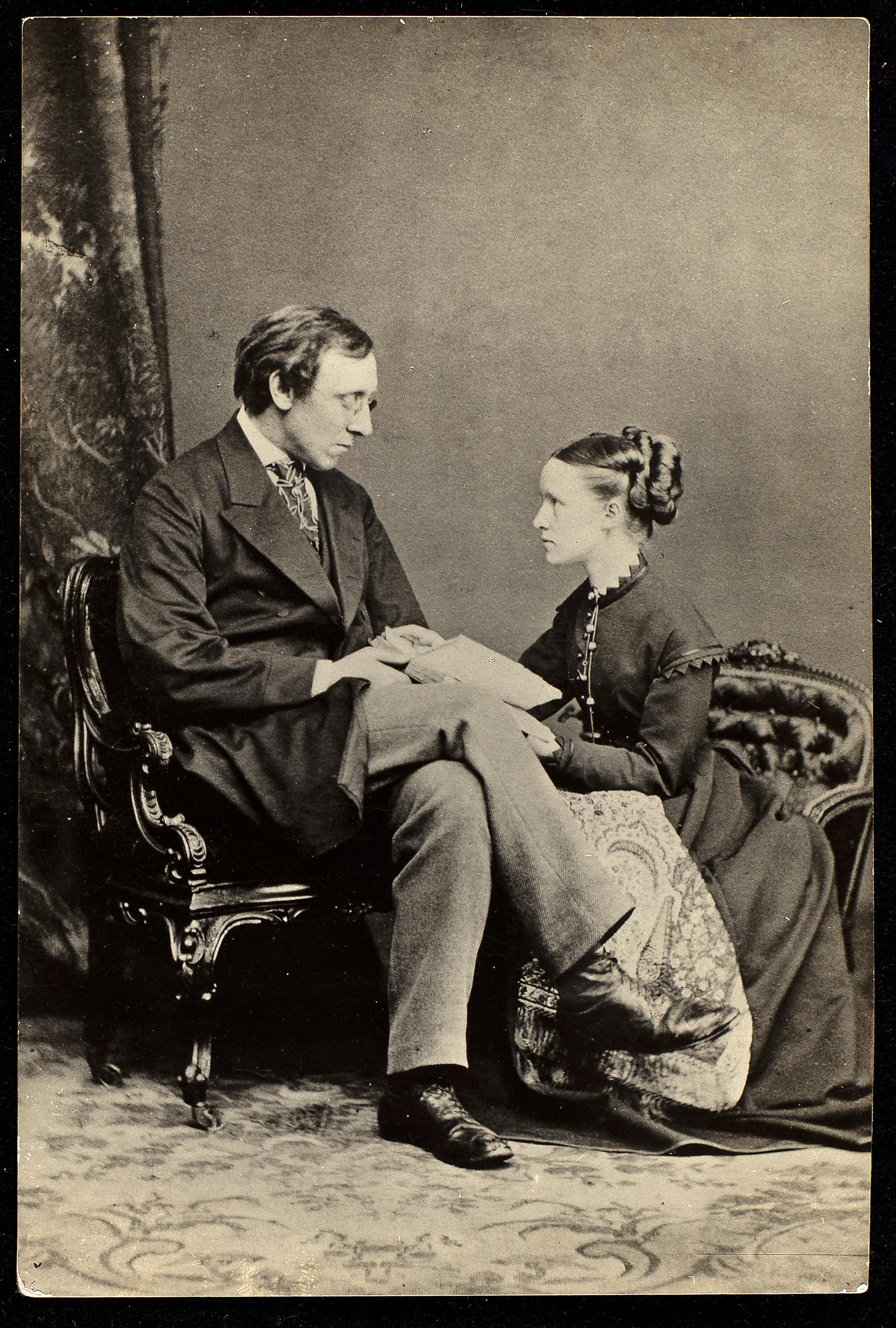
Millicent and Henry Fawcett

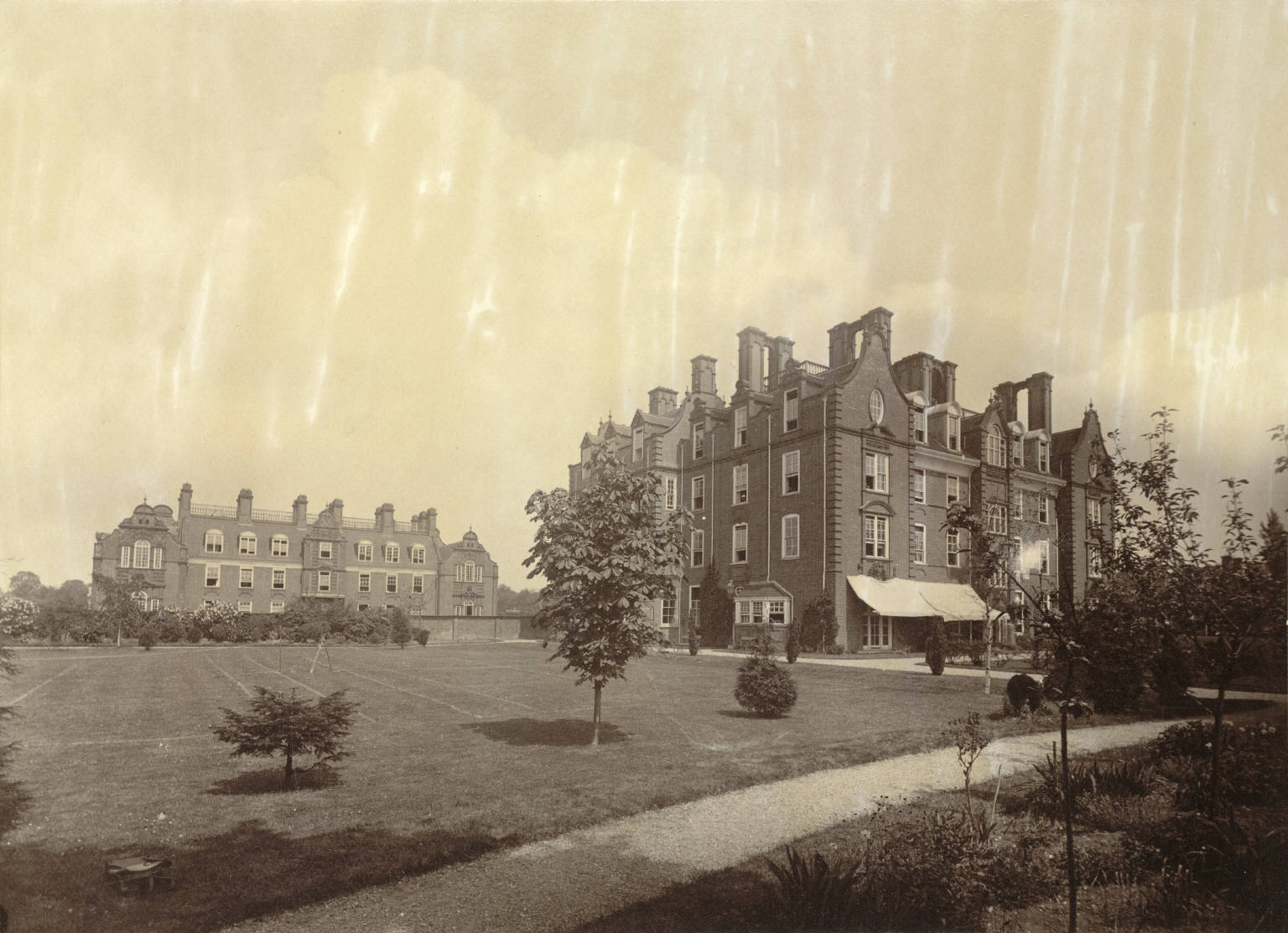
Millicent Fawcett co-founded Newnham College for Women in 1871

John Stuart Mill introduced Millicent Garrett to many other women's rights activists, including Henry Fawcett, a Liberal Member of Parliament who had intended to marry her sister Elizabeth before she decided to focus on her medical career. Millicent and Henry married on 23 April 1867. Henry had been blinded in a shooting accident in 1858 and Millicent acted as his secretary. Their marriage was said to be based on "perfect intellectual sympathy"; Millicent pursued a writing career while caring for Henry, and ran two households, one in Cambridge, one in London. The family held strong beliefs in favour of proportional representation, individualistic and free trade principles, and advancement for women. Their only child, Philippa, born in 1868, was much encouraged by her mother in her studies. In 1890 Philippa became the first woman to obtain top score in the Cambridge Mathematical Tripos exams.

In 1868 Fawcett joined the London Suffrage Committee, and in 1869 spoke at the first public pro-suffrage meeting held in London. In March 1870 she spoke in Brighton, her husband's constituency. As a speaker she was said to have a clear voice. In 1870 she published her short Political Economy for Beginners, which was "wildly successful", running to 10 editions in 41 years. In 1871 she contributed an article to Macmillan's Magazine entitled "A short explanation of Mr. Hare's scheme of representation," concerning single transferable voting. In 1872 Fawcett and her husband published Essays and Lectures on Social and Political Subjects, containing eight of her essays. Fawcett and Anne Clough's interest in higher education for women saw the co-founding of Newnham Hall in 1871 where Millicent served on the Council of the Newnham Hall (later Newnham College) Company from 1881 to 1909. During this time, she and fellow suffragists, including Ethel Snowden, Miss Alison and Mrs Arnold Lupton, delivered speeches to crowds but were, on occasion, objected to by some of their audience.

Despite many interests and duties, Fawcett and her sister Agnes raised four of their cousins, who had been orphaned early in life: Amy Garrett Badley, Fydell Edmund Garrett, Elsie Garrett (who became a prominent botanical artist in South Africa), and Elsie's twin, John. In 1874 Fawcett had a bad fall from a horse that prevented her from attending a meeting of the National Society for Women's Suffrage in Leeds.

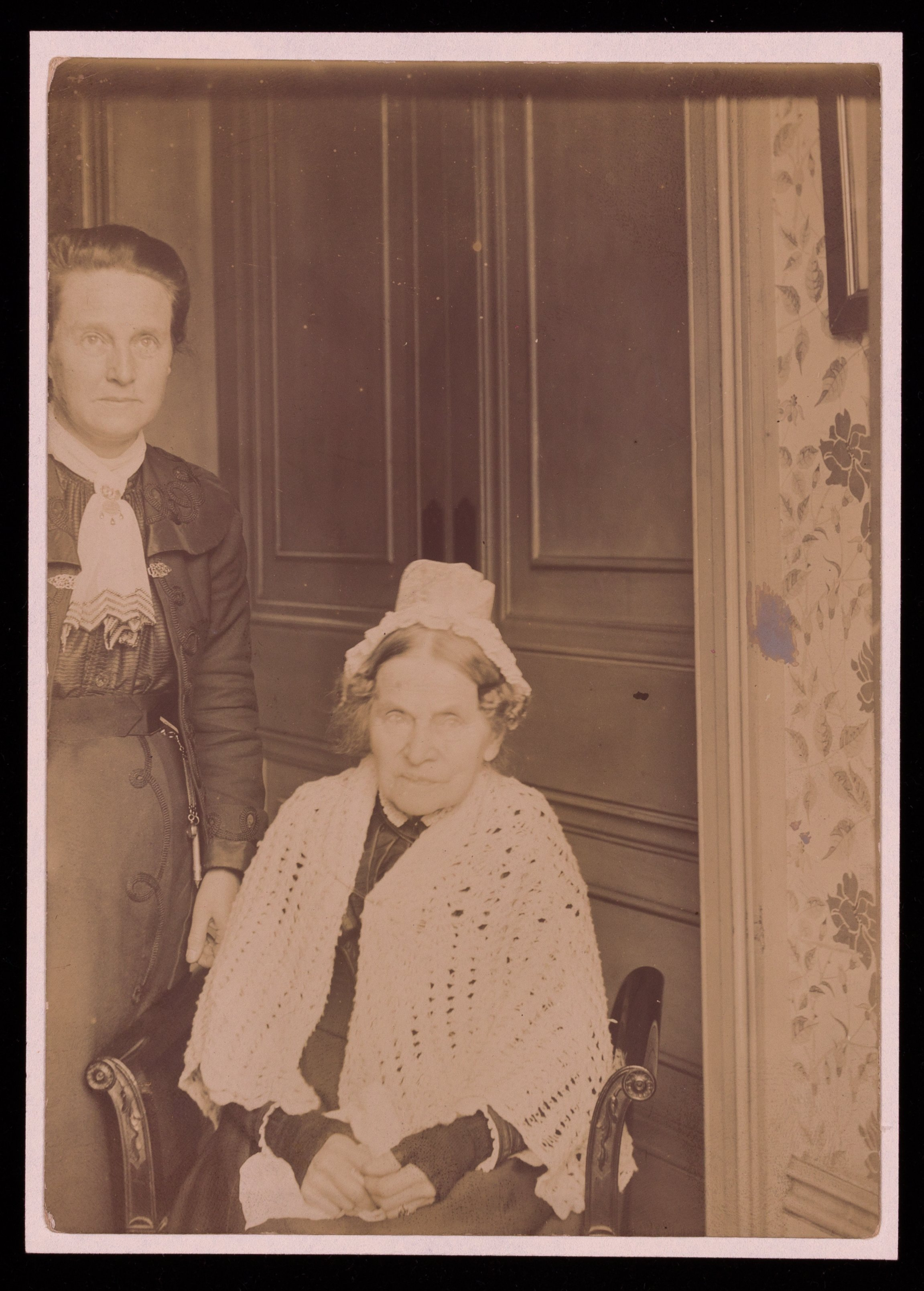
Millicent Fawcett with her mother Louisa Garrett c.1899

After Fawcett's husband died on 6 November 1884, she temporarily withdrew from public life, sold both family homes and moved with Philippa to the house of her sister, Agnes . Enid Moberly Bell's biography of social reformer Octavia Hill records that Hill had "set her heart on securing" the Fawcetts' home, The Lawn, in Lambeth "as a park for Lambeth". At this time, Fawcett, an instigator for the park's creation, gave a speech at Lambeth Palace, which had been lent by the Archbishop for the meeting, and The Lawn, renamed Vauxhall Park, was formally opened in July 1890, by the Prince of Wales; Princess Louise, who had followed Octavia's work with interest and sympathy for many years was present.

When Fawcett resumed work in 1885, she concentrated on politics and was a key member of what became the Women's Local Government Society. Originally a Liberal, she joined the Liberal Unionist Party in 1886 to oppose Irish Home Rule. She, like many English Protestants, felt that allowing home rule for Catholic Ireland would hurt England's prosperity and be disastrous for the Irish. In 1885, Fawcett also voiced her support for W. T. Stead over his term of imprisonment. What made Stead exemplary, according to Fawcett, was his commitment to ‘protect and shelter the weak which echoed Dr Clifford's eulogy at Stead's Westminster Chapel memorial service: 'No movement that gave promise of help to woman called in vain for his chivalry and devotion.' Fawcett was a founder member of the National Vigilance Association, a moral purity campaign brought to prominence by Stead's 1885 exposure of the white slave trade in London. 'Stead Hostels' were named in his honour to house and protect young working women and girls.

In 1891 Fawcett wrote the introduction to a new edition of Mary Wollstonecraft's book A Vindication of the Rights of Woman. Lyndall Gordon calls this an "influential essay"; she reasserted the reputation of the early feminist philosopher and claimed her as an early figure in the struggle for the vote.

Fawcett was granted an honorary doctorate of law by the University of St Andrews in 1899.

== Political activities ==
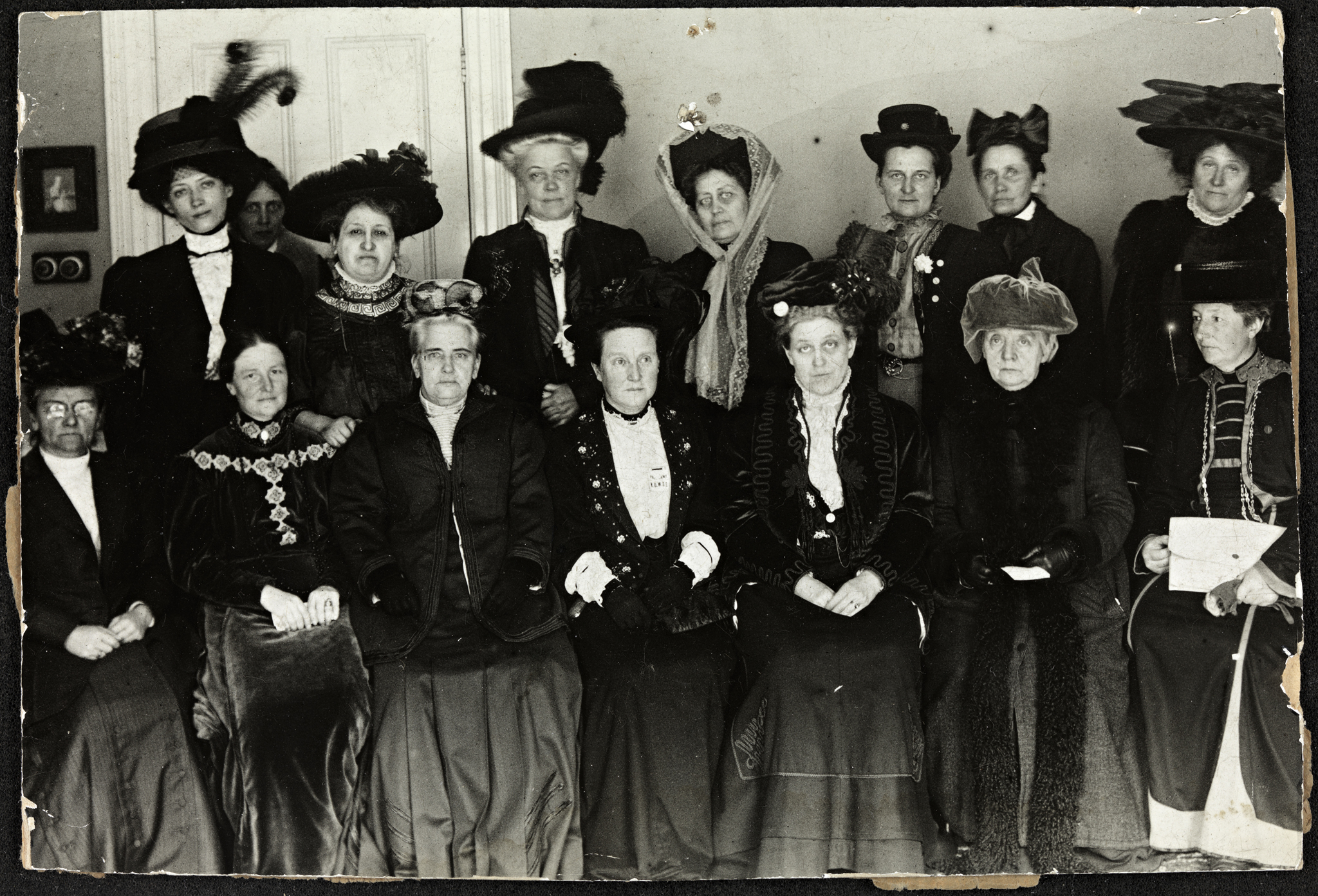
Members of the International Woman Suffrage Alliance at the 5th Congress with Fawcett presiding, London 1909. Top row from left: Thora Daugaard (Denmark), Louise Qvam (Norway), Aletta Jacobs (Netherlands), Annie Furuhjelm (Finland), Zinaida Mirowitch (Zinaida Ivanova) (Russia), Käthe Schirmacher (Germany), Klara Honneger (Switzerland), unidentified. Bottom left: Unidentified, Anna Bugge (Sweden), Anna Howard Shaw (USA), Millicent Fawcett (Presiding, England), Carrie Chapman Catt (USA), F. M. Qvam (Norway), Anita Augspurg (Germany).

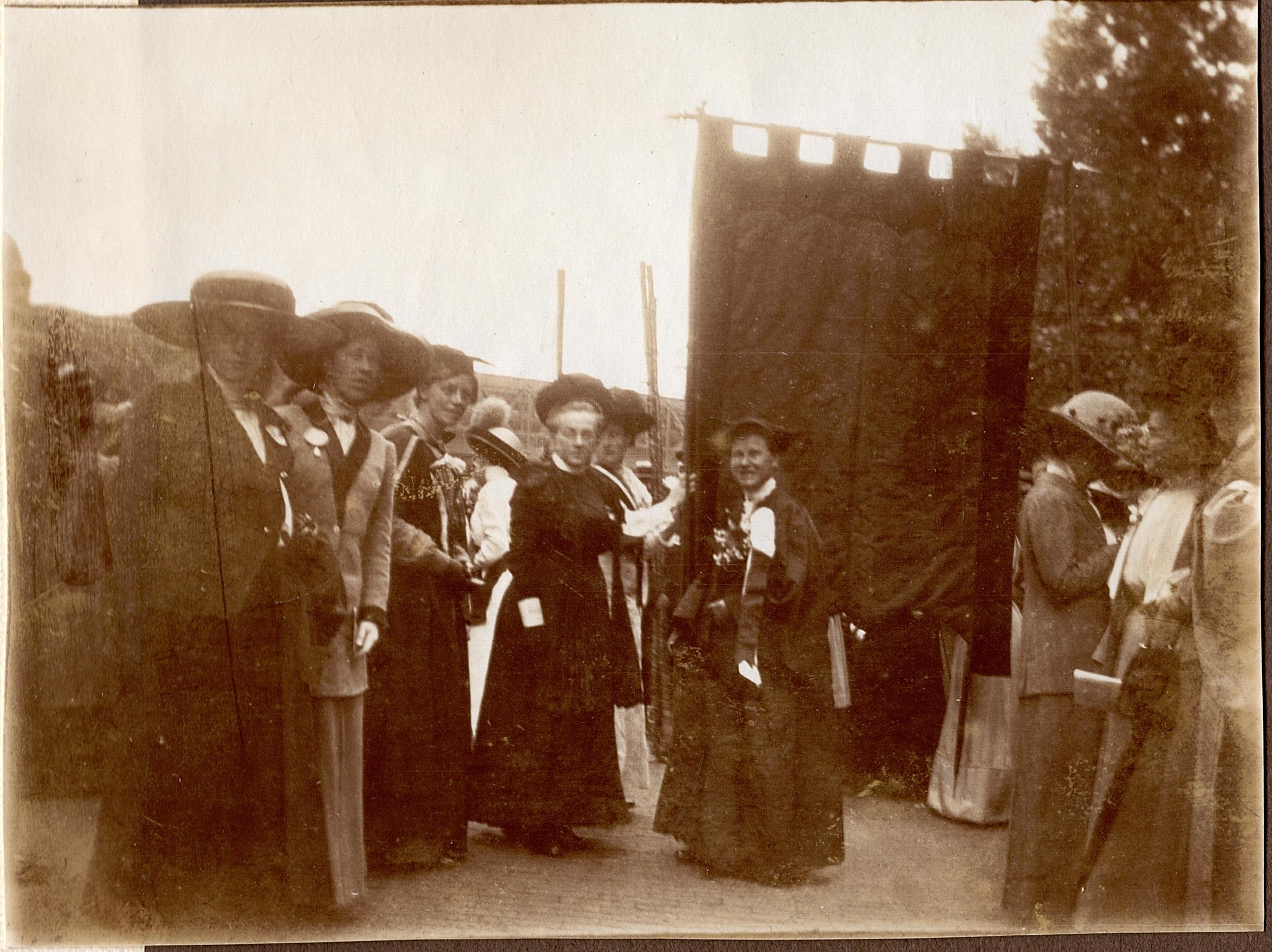
1911 – Fawcett as President of the NUWSS (fifth from left) with Lady Frances Balfour (to her left) – a member of the executive committee – photographed at the Women's Coronation Procession

Fawcett mainly fought for women's suffrage. She stated that Irish home rule would be "a blow to the greatness and prosperity of England as well as disaster and... misery and pain and shame". At a young age she published essays on the need for proportional representation, "electoral disabilities of women", "education of women" and addressing the national debt.

Fawcett began her political career at the age of 22, at the first women's suffrage meeting. By 1871, she was a member of the Executive Committee of the London Branch of the National Society for Women's Suffrage which had been established on 5 July 1867 and was "therefore in the fifth year of its work" in 1871. After the death of Lydia Becker, Fawcett became leader of the National Union of Women's Suffrage Societies (NUWSS), Britain's main suffragist organisation. Politically she took a moderate position, distancing herself from the militancy and direct actions of the Women's Social and Political Union (WSPU), which she believed would harm women's chances of winning the vote by souring public opinion and alienating members of Parliament. Despite the publicity for the WSPU, the NUWSS with its slogan "Law-Abiding suffragists" retained more support. By 1897, Fawcett was president of the newly formed NUWSS and Lady Frances Balfour a member of the executive committee. By 1905, Fawcett's NUWSS had 305 constituent societies and almost 50,000 members, compared with the WSPU's 2,000 members in 1913.

The NUWSS organised its first large, open-air procession which came to be known as the Mud March on 9 February 1907. They then organised a great march in 1908, when the students of Newnham and Girton College's made and carried a banner, used again in subsequent processions and now held at Newnham. In the 1908 march, women moved in eight blocks according to their professions. There were patronising and dismissive male comments about the march and Millicent herself, but she and the women insisted on their professional standing.

She explains her disaffiliation from the more militant movement in her book What I Remember:

I could not support a revolutionary movement, especially as it was ruled autocratically, at first, by a small group of four persons, and latterly by one person only.... In 1908, this despotism decreed that the policy of suffering violence, but using none, was to be abandoned. After that, I had no doubt whatever that what was right for me and the NUWSS was to keep strictly to our principle of supporting our movement only by argument, based on common sense and experience and not by personal violence or lawbreaking of any kind.

The South African War gave a chance to Fawcett to share female responsibilities in British culture. She was nominated to lead a commission of women sent to South Africa, sailing there in July 1901 with other women "to investigate Emily Hobhouse's indictment of atrocious conditions in concentration camps where the families of the Boer soldiers were interned." No British women had been entrusted before with such a task in wartime. Millicent fought for the civil rights of the Uitlanders "as the cause of revival of interest in women's suffrage".

Fawcett had backed countless campaigns over many years, for instance to curb child abuse by raising the age of consent, criminalise incest and cruelty to children within the family, end the practice of excluding women from courtrooms when sexual offences were considered, stamp out the "white slave trade", and prevent child marriage and the introduction of regulated prostitution in India. Fawcett campaigned to repeal the Contagious Diseases Acts, as reflecting sexual double standards. They required prostitutes to be examined for sexually transmitted diseases and if found to have passed disease to their clients, to be imprisoned. Women could be arrested on suspicion of being a prostitute and imprisoned for refusing consent to examinations that were invasive and painful. The men who infected the women were not subject to the Acts, which were repealed through campaigning by Fawcett and others. She believed such double standards would never be erased until women were represented in the public sphere.

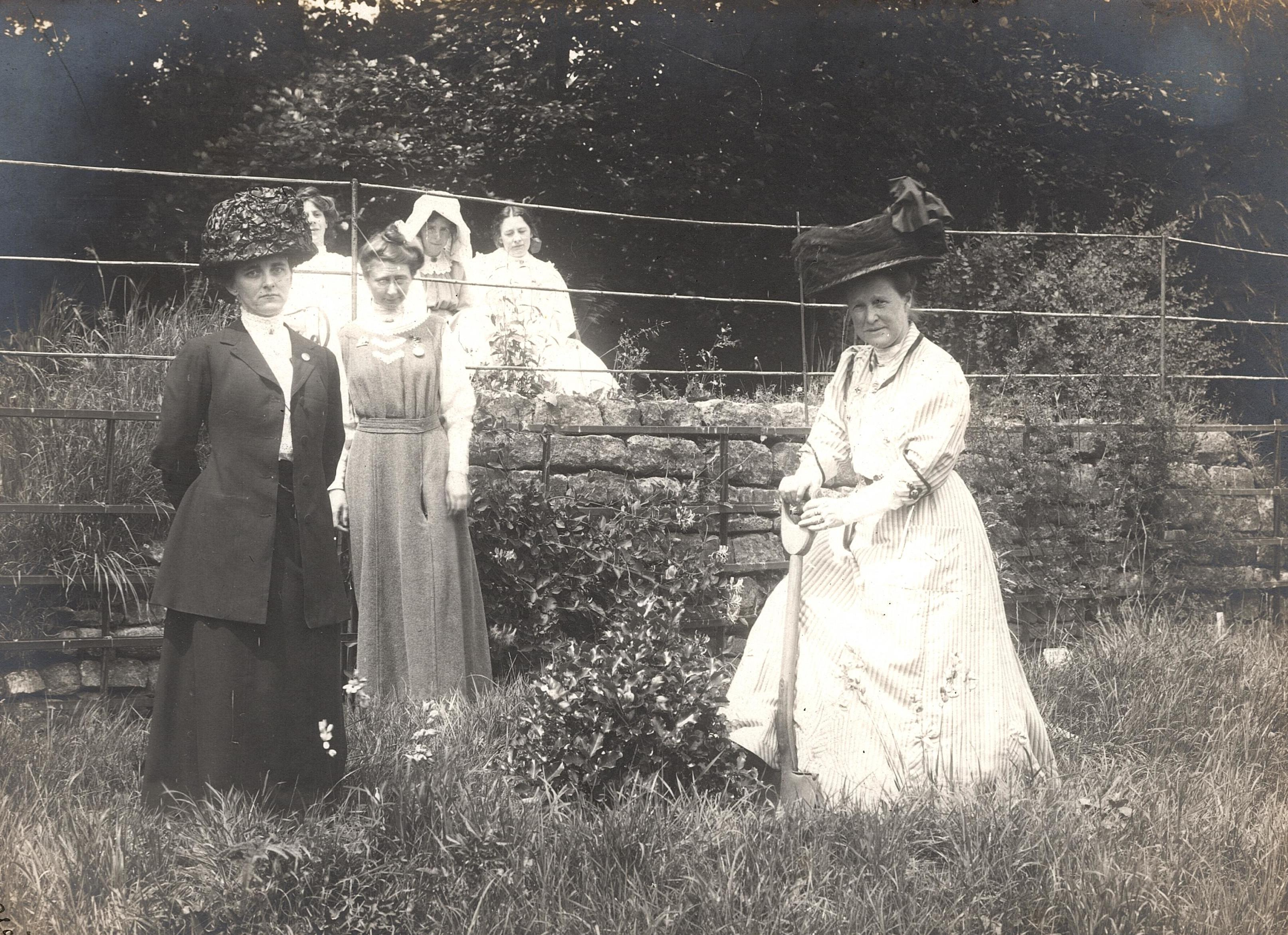
At front: Mary Morris, Mary Blathwayt and Fawcett at Eagle House, Bath, 1910. Annie and Kitty Kenney and Adela Pankhurst in the background.

Fawcett wrote three books, one co-authored with her husband, and many articles, some published posthumously. Her Political Economy for Beginners went into ten editions, sparked two novels, and appeared in many languages. One of her first articles on women's education appeared in Macmillan's Magazine in 1875, the year when her interest in women's education led her to become a founder of Newnham College for Women in Cambridge. There she served on the college council and backed a controversial bid for all women to receive Cambridge degrees. Millicent regularly spoke at girls' schools, women's colleges and adult education centres. In 1904, she resigned from the Unionists over free trade, when Joseph Chamberlain gained control in his campaign for tariff reform.

When the First World War broke out in 1914, the WSPU ceased all activities to focus on the war effort. Fawcett's NUWSS replaced her political activity with support for hospital services in training camps, Scotland, Russia and Serbia, largely because the organisation was markedly less militant than the WSPU: it contained many more pacifists and support for the war within it was weaker. The WSPU was called jingoistic for its leaders' strong support for the war. While Fawcett was no pacifist, she risked dividing the organisation if she ordered a halt to the campaign and diverted NUWSS funds to the government as the WSPU had. The NUWSS continued to campaign for the vote during the war and used the situation to its advantage by pointing out the contribution women had made to the war effort. She held her post until 1919, a year after the first women had received the vote under the Representation of the People Act 1918. After that, she left the suffrage campaign and devoted time to writing books, including a biography of Josephine Butler.

== Later years ==
In 1919 Fawcett was awarded an honorary doctorate from the University of Birmingham. In the 1925 New Year Honours she was appointed Dame Grand Cross of the Order of the British Empire (GBE).

Fawcett died in 1929 at her London home in Gower Street, Bloomsbury. She was cremated at the Golders Green Crematorium although the final resting place of her ashes is unknown.

In 1932, a memorial to Fawcett, alongside that of her husband, was unveiled in Westminster Abbey with an inscription: "A wise constant and courageous Englishwoman. She won citizenship for women."

== Legacy ==
Millicent Fawcett Hall was constructed in 1929 in Westminster as a place for women's debates and discussions; presently owned by Westminster School, the hall is used by the drama department as a 150-seat studio theatre. Saint Felix School, near Fawcett's birthplace of Aldeburgh, has named one of its boarding houses after her. A blue plaque for Fawcett was erected in 1954 by London County Council at her home of 45 years in Bloomsbury. The archives of Millicent Fawcett are held at The Women's Library, London School of Economics, which in 2018 renamed one of its campus buildings Fawcett House in honour of her role in the British suffrage movement and her connections to the area.

In February 2018, Fawcett won a BBC Radio 4 poll asking Britons to name the most influential woman of the past 100 years.

The Millicent Fawcett Mile is an annual one-mile running race for women, inaugurated in 2018 at the Müller Anniversary Games in London.

== Commemoration ==
In 2018, 100 years after the passing of the Representation of the People Act, for which Fawcett had successfully campaigned and which granted limited franchise, she became the first woman commemorated with a statue in Parliament Square, by the sculptor Gillian Wearing. This followed a campaign led by Caroline Criado Perez, in which over 84,000 online signatures were gathered.

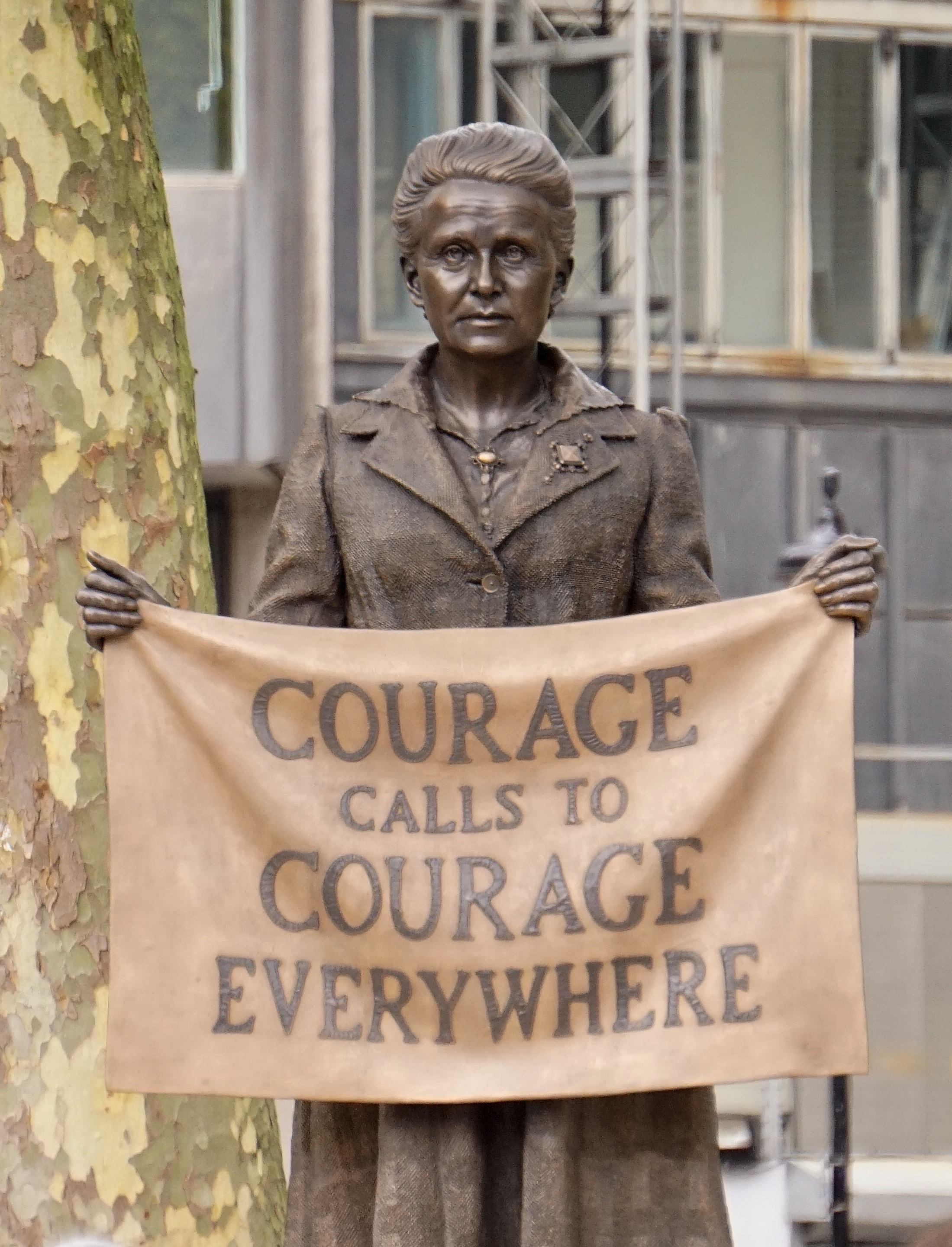
Statue of Millicent Fawcett in Parliament Square

Fawcett's statue holds a banner quoting from a speech she gave in 1920, after Emily Davison's death during the 1913 Epsom Derby: "Courage calls to courage everywhere". At its unveiling Theresa May said, "I would not be standing here today as Prime Minister, no female MPs would have taken their seats in Parliament, none of us would have the rights we now enjoy, were it not for one truly great woman: Dame Millicent Garrett Fawcett."

== Notable works ==
- 1870: Political Economy for Beginners Full text online
- 1872: Essays and Lectures on Social and Political Subjects (some essays by Millicent; others by her husband Henry Fawcett. One essay she wrote explains the Hare (STV) form of proportional representation) Full text online.
- 1872: Electoral Disabilities of Women: a lecture
- 1874: Tales in Political Economy Full text online
- 1875: Janet Doncaster, a novel, set in her birthplace of Aldeburgh, Suffolk Full text online
- 1889: Some Eminent Women of our Times: short biographical sketches Full text online
- 1895: Life of Her Majesty, Queen Victoria Full text online
- 1901: Life of the Right Hon. Sir William Molesworth Full text online
- 1905: Five Famous French Women Full text online
- 1912: Women's Suffrage : a Short History of a Great Movement ISBN 0-9542632-4-3 Full text online
- 1920: The Women's Victory and After: Personal reminiscences, 1911–1918 Full text online
- 1924: What I Remember (Pioneers of the Woman's Movement) ISBN 0-88355-261-2 Full text online
- 1926: Easter in Palestine, 1921–1922 Text online
- 1927: Josephine Butler: her work and principles and their meaning for the twentieth century (written with Ethel M. Turner)
- A selection of her speeches, pamphlets, and newspaper columns is published by UCL Press, discovery.ucl.ac.uk

== See also ==
=== People ===
- Mary Wollstonecraft, author of A Vindication of the Rights of Woman in 1792
- Josephine Butler, early feminist and subject of Millicent Fawcett's biography
- Lydia Becker, founder of the Women's Suffrage Journal
- Emmeline Pankhurst, founder of the Women's Social and Political Union
- Charlotte Despard, co-founder of the Women's Freedom League
- List of suffragists and suffragettes
- List of women's rights activists

=== History ===
- Women's suffrage in the United Kingdom
- History of feminism
- Timeline of women's suffrage

== Gallery ==
Portraits
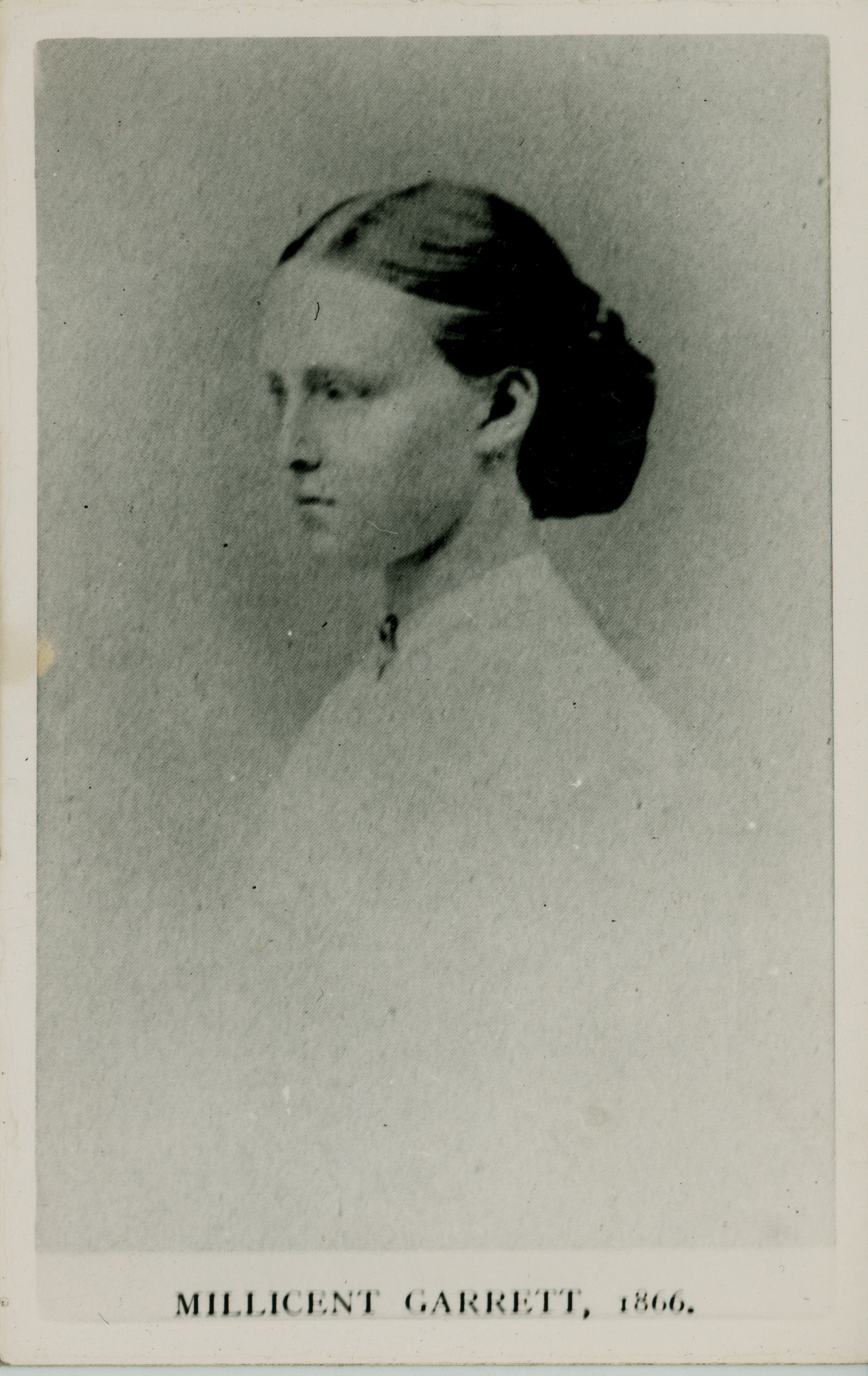
1866

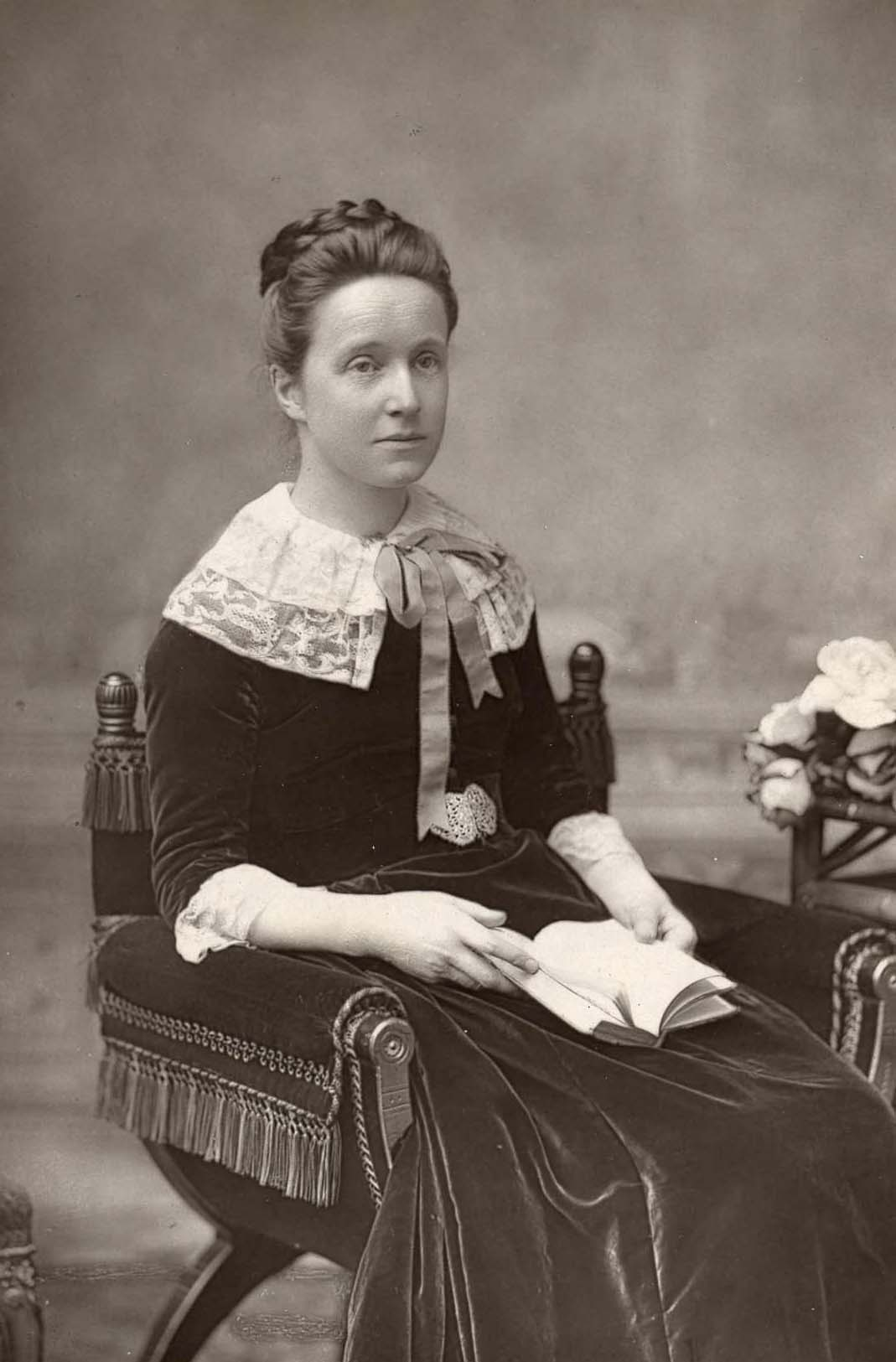
1870

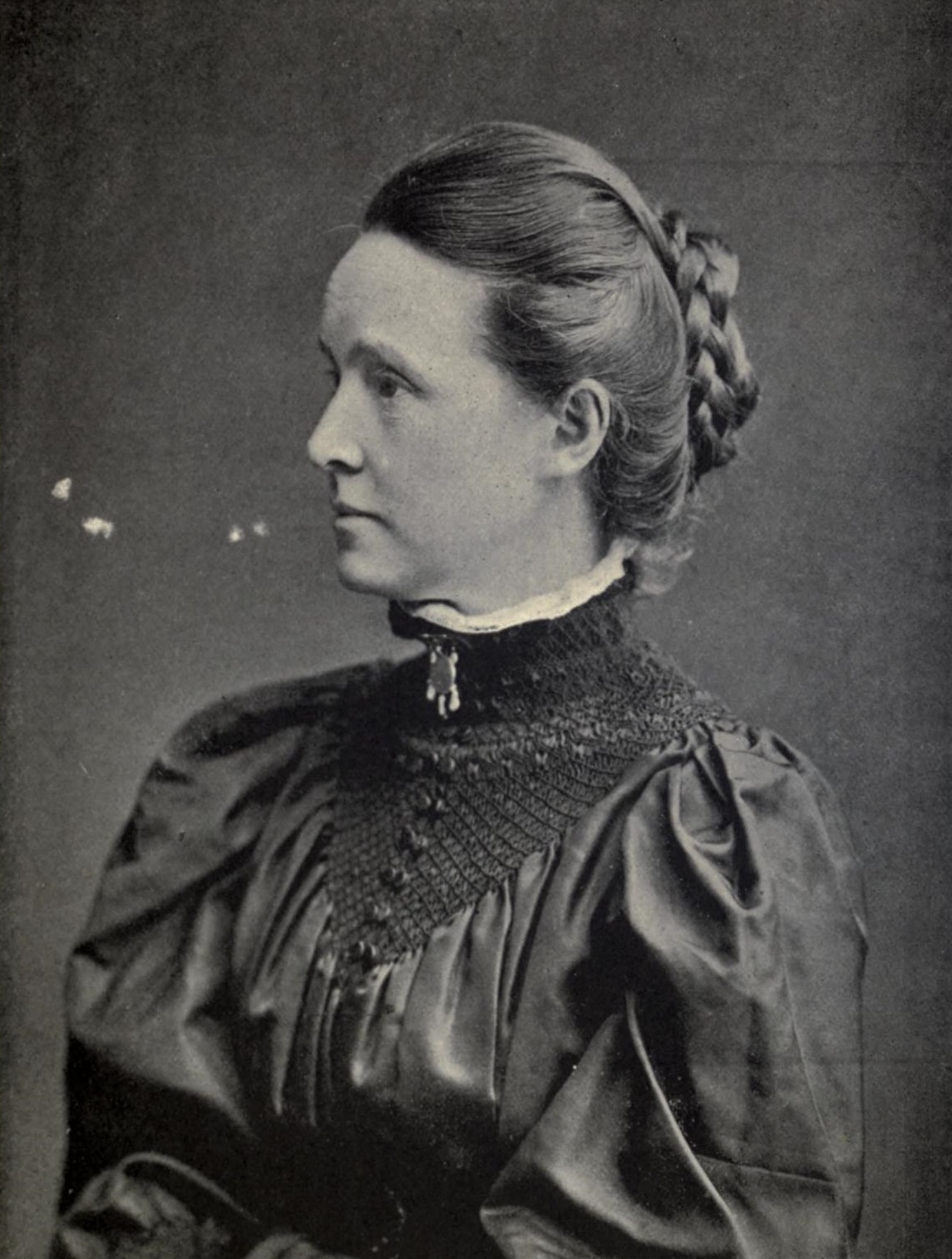
c. 1890s

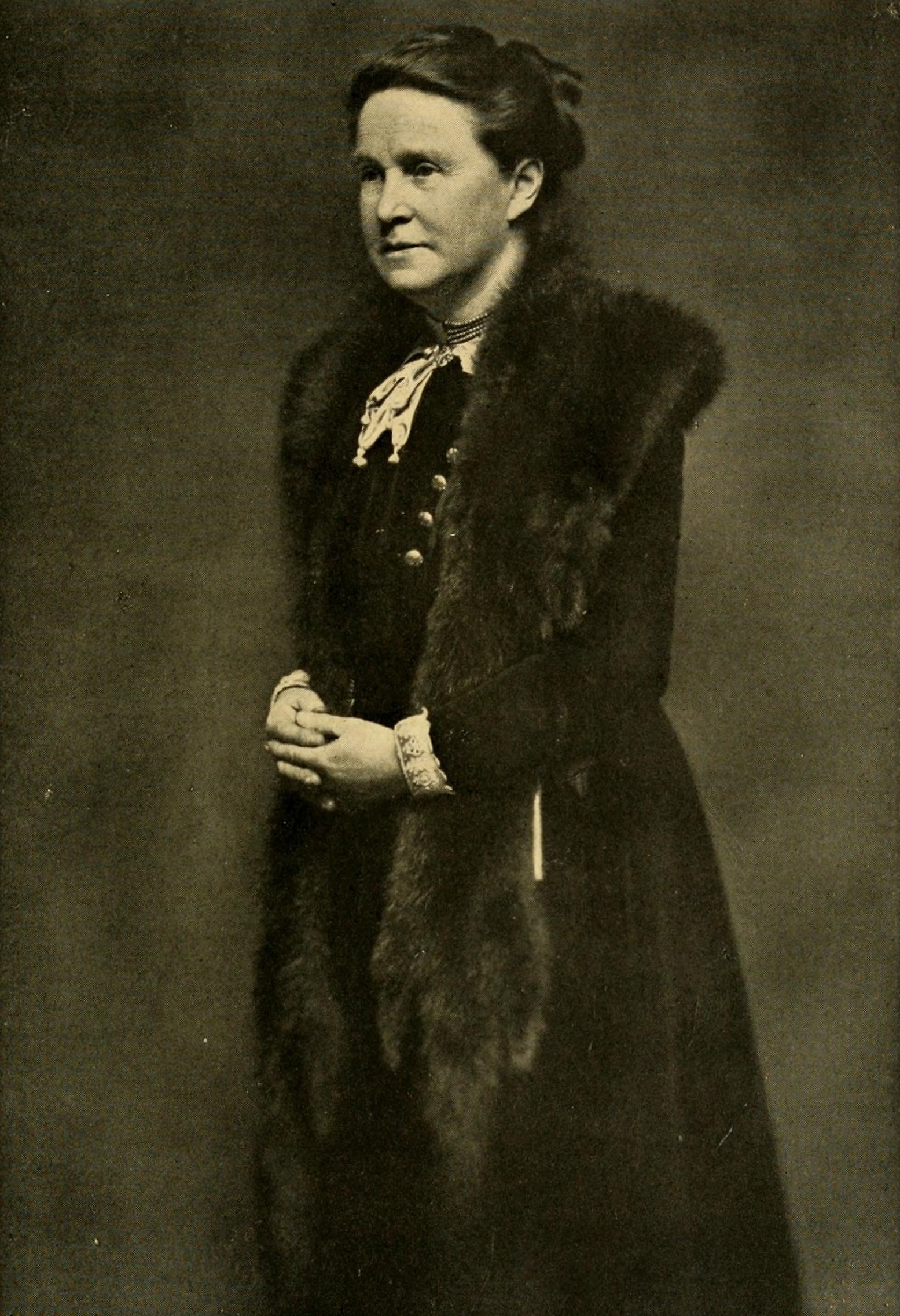
1918

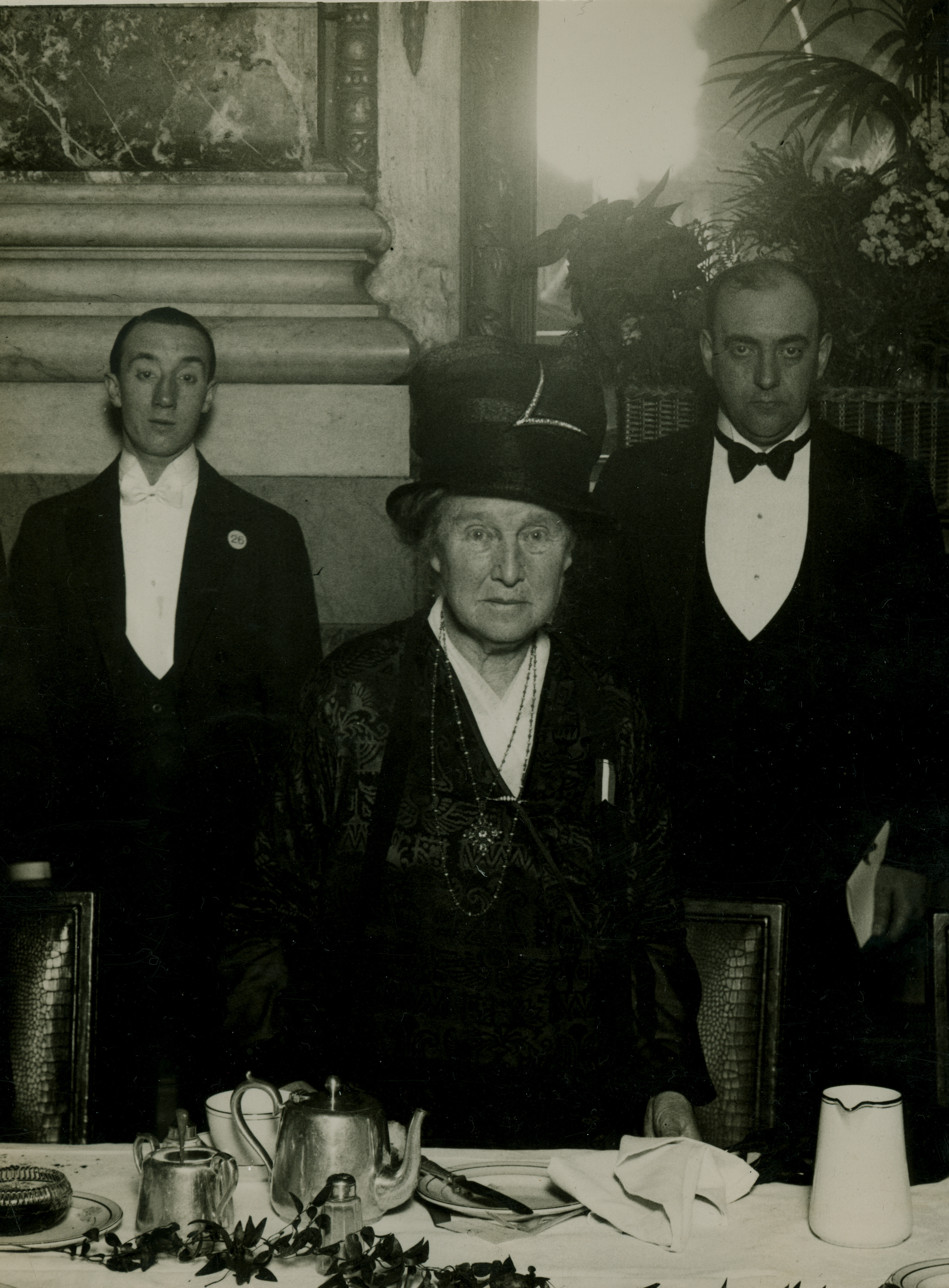
c. 1920s
Legacies in London
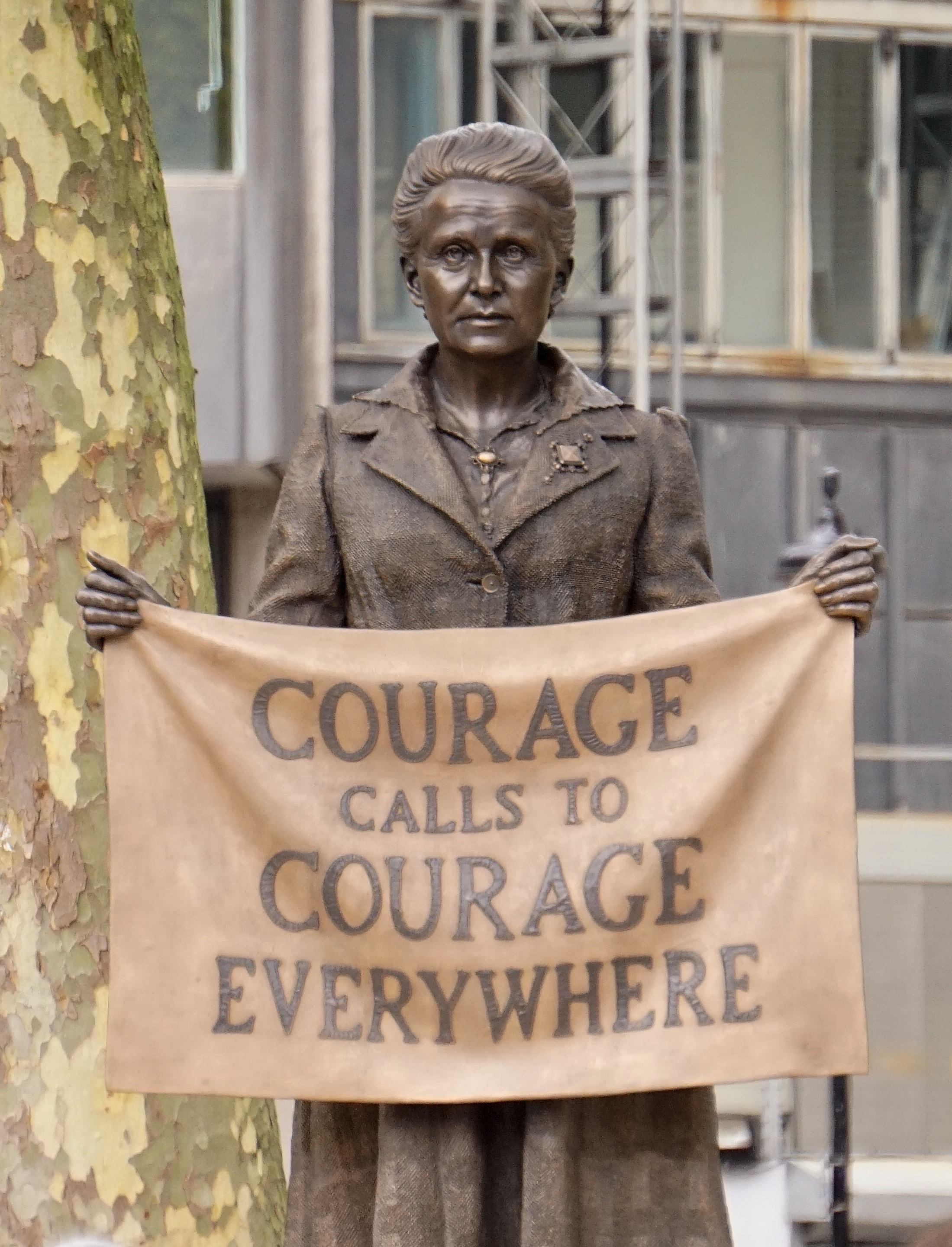
Statue, Parliament Square

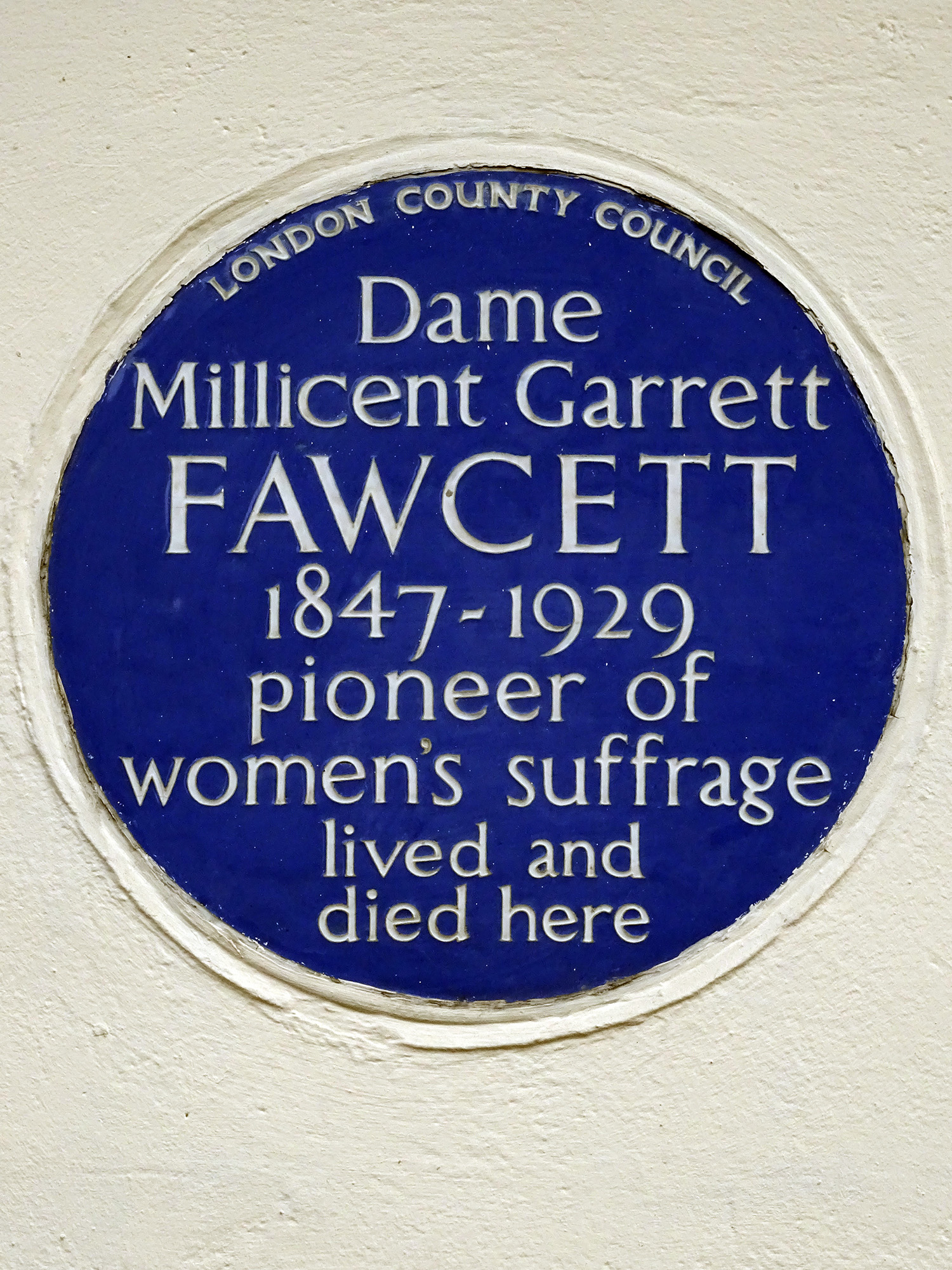
Blue plaque, Gower Street, Bloomsbury

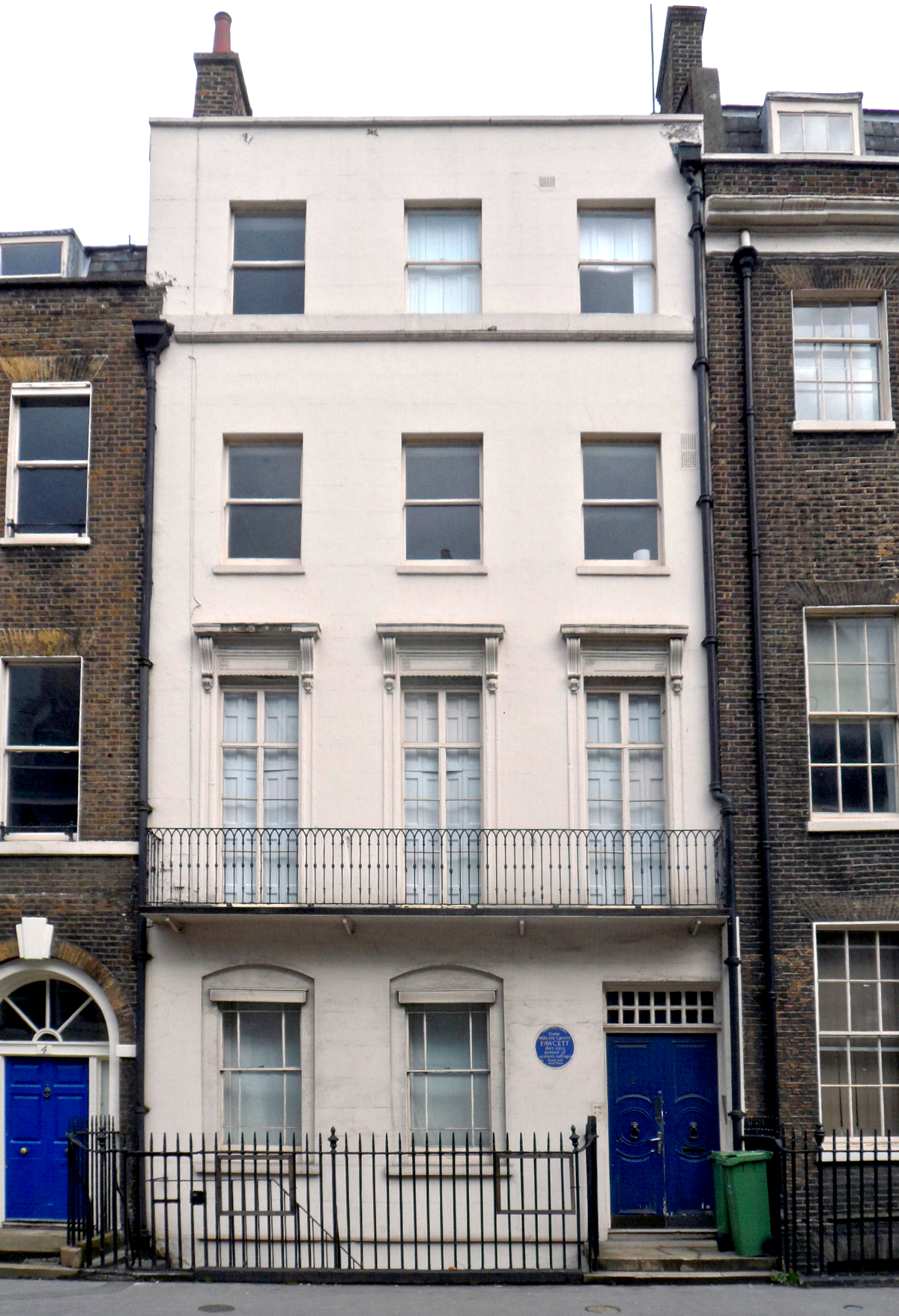
Home from 1885 to 1929

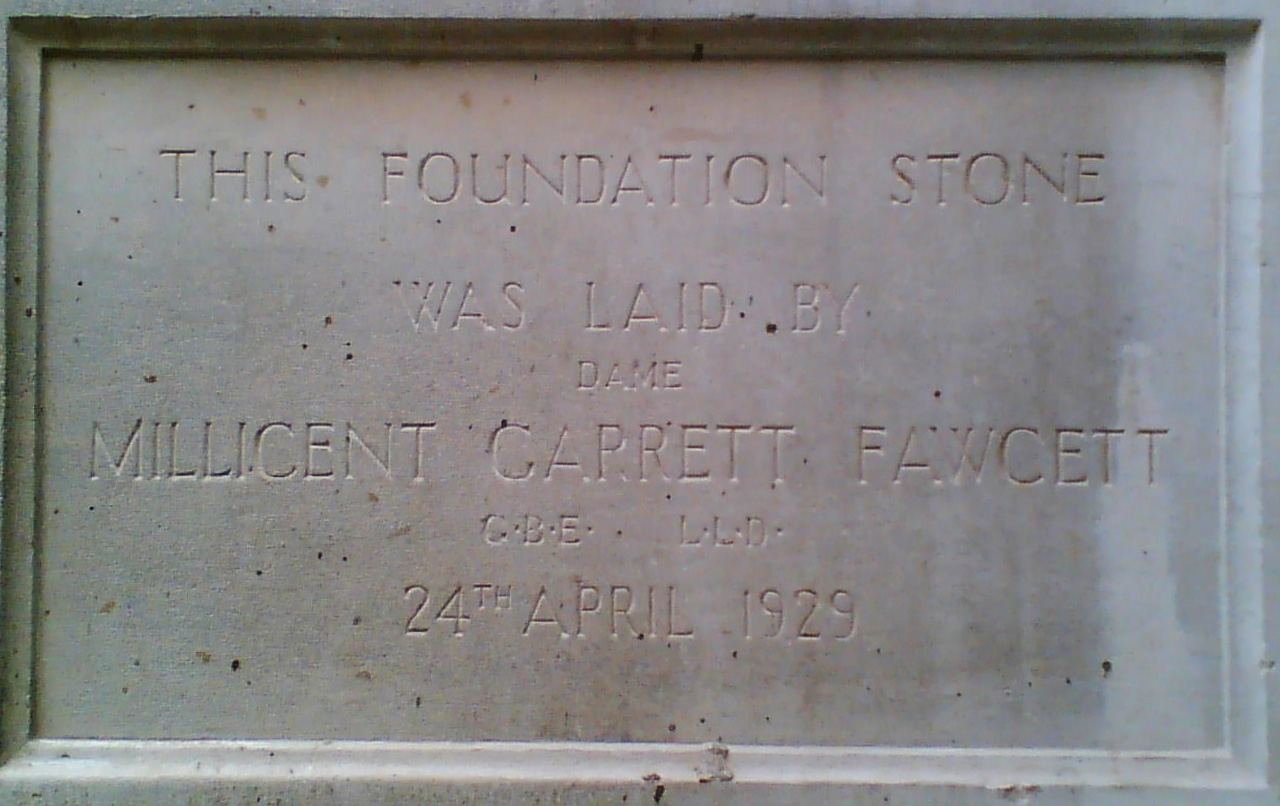
Foundation stone, Millicent Fawcett Hall, Westminster

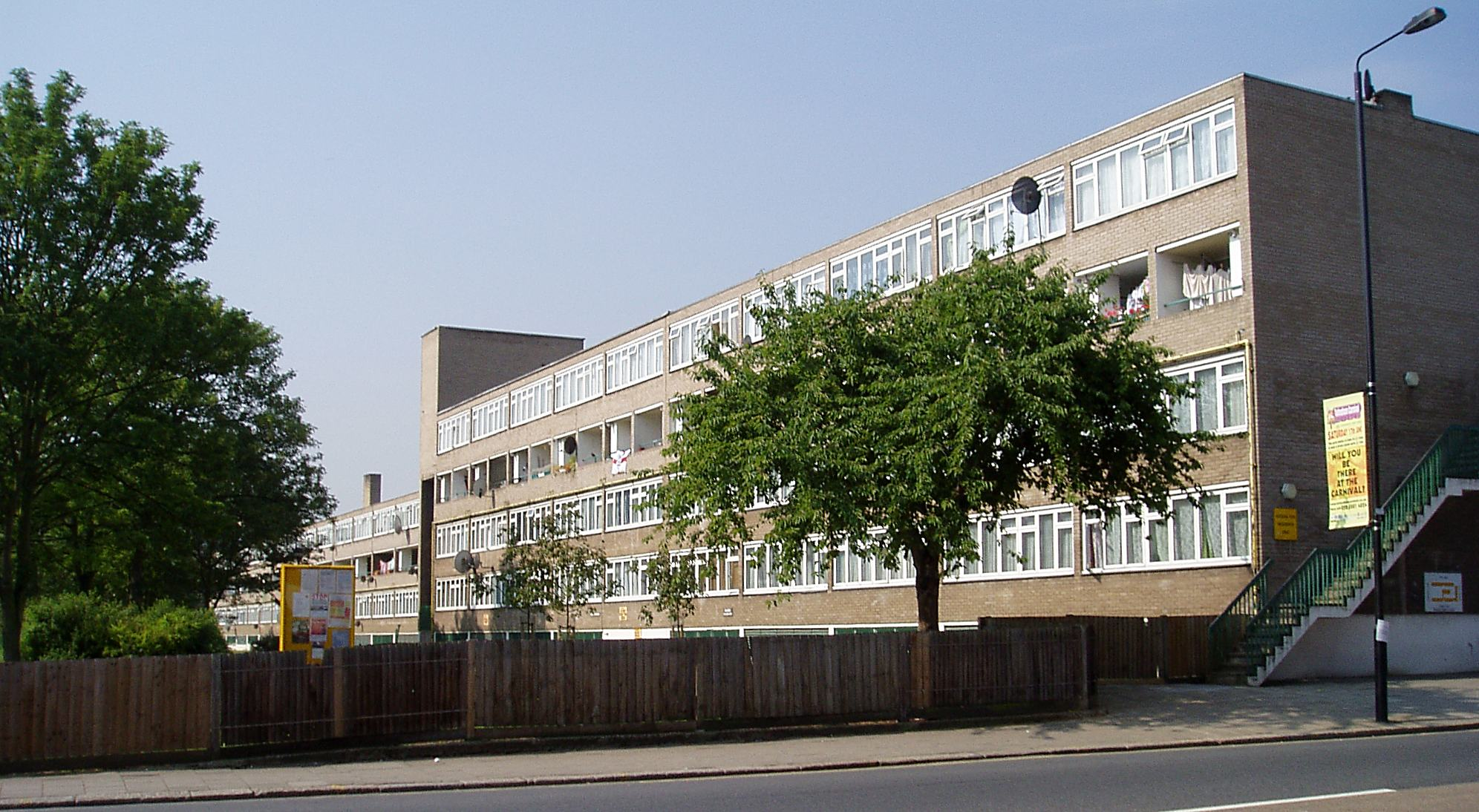
Millicent Fawcett Court, Lordship Lane, Haringey
