= Bedales School =

Public school in Hampshire, England

Coordinates: 51°1′13″N 0°56′32″W

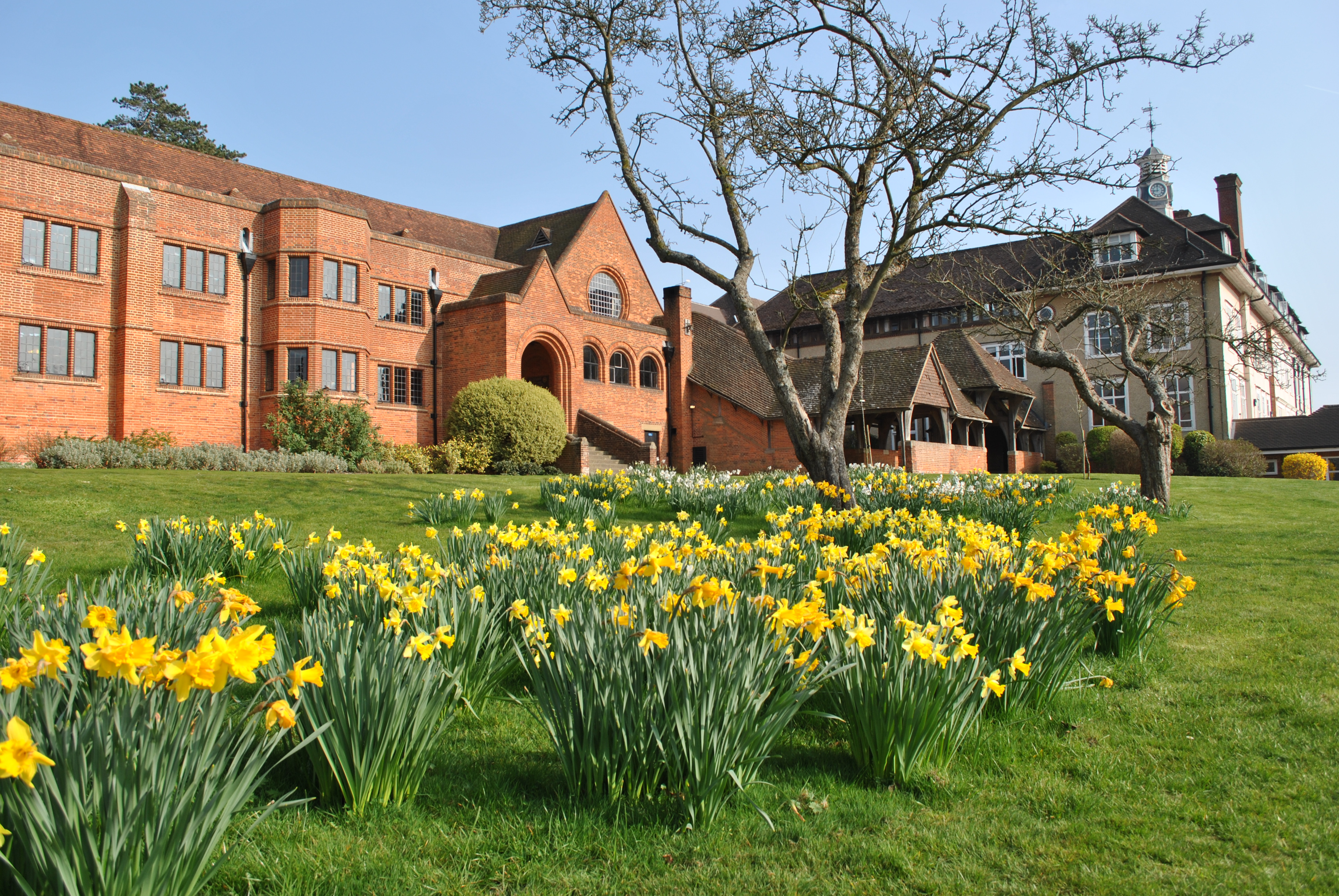

Location
- Church Road; Steep, Hampshire, GU32 2DG; England

Information
- Type: Private boarding and day school Public school
- Motto: Work of Each for Weal of All
- Established: 1893
- Founder: John Haden Badley
- Department for Education URN: 116527 Tables
- Headmaster: William Goldsmith
- Gender: Co-educational
- Age: 3 to 18
- Enrolment: 761
- Website: www.bedales.org.uk

Bedales School is a coeducational boarding and day public school, in the village of Steep, near the market town of Petersfield in Hampshire, England. It was founded in 1893 by Amy Garrett Badley and John Haden Badley in reaction to the limitations of conventional Victorian schools and has been co-educational since 1898.

== History ==
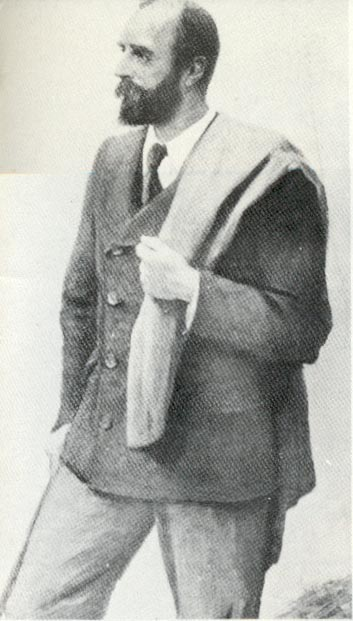
John Haden Badley, co-founder of the school

The school was started in 1893 by Amy Garrett Badley and John Haden Badley. John had met Oswald B Powell when they were introduced to each other by Goldsworthy Lowes Dickinson, whom they both knew from their Cambridge days. John said that Oswald and his wife, Winifred Powell, were as important as Amy and him. A house called Bedales was rented just outside Lindfield, near Haywards Heath. In 1899 Badley and Powell (the latter borrowing heavily from his father, the Vicar of Bisham) purchased a country estate near Steep and constructed a purpose-built school, including state-of-the-art electric lighting, which opened in 1900. The site has been extensively developed over the past century, including the relocation of a number of historic vernacular timber frame barns. A preparatory school, Dunhurst, was started in 1902 on Montessori principles (and was visited in 1919 by Maria Montessori herself), and a primary school, Dunannie, was added in the 1950s.

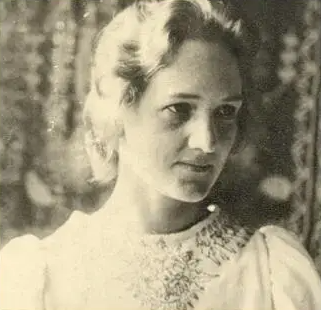
Amy Badley, co-founder of the school

The Badleys took a non-denominational approach to religion and the school has never had a chapel: its relatively secular teaching made it attractive in its early days to nonconformists, agnostics, Quakers, Unitarians and liberal Jews, who formed a significant element of its early intake. The school was also well known and popular in some Cambridge and Fabian intellectual circles, with connections to the Wedgwoods, Darwins, Huxleys, and Trevelyans. Books such as A quoi tient la supériorité des Anglo-Saxons? and L'Education nouvelle popularised the school on the Continent, leading to a cosmopolitan intake of Russian and other European children in the 1920s.

Bedales was originally a small and intimate school: the 1900 buildings were designed for 150 pupils. Under a programme of expansion and modernisation in the 1960s and 1970s under the headmastership of Tim Slack, the senior school grew from 240 pupils in 1966 to 340, thereafter increasing to some 465.

== Heads ==
- 1893–1935 John Haden Badley
- 1936–1946 F A Meier
- 1946–1962 Hector Beaumont Jacks
- 1962–1974 Tim Slack
- 1974–1981 Patrick Nobes
- 1981–1992 Euan MacAlpine
- 1992–1994 Ian Newton
- 1994–2001 Alison Willcocks
- 2001–2018 Keith Budge
- 2018–2021 Magnus Bashaarat
- 2021–present Will Goldsmith

== The campus ==
Since 1900 the school has been located on a 120-acre (0.49 km^{2}) estate in the village of Steep, near Petersfield, Hampshire. As well as playing fields, orchards, woodland, pasture, multiple sport pitches and a nature reserve, the campus also has two Grade I listed arts and crafts buildings designed by Ernest Gimson, the Lupton Hall (1911), which was co-designed, built and largely financed by ex-pupil Geoffrey Lupton, and the Memorial Library (1921).

There are three contemporary, award-winning buildings:

- The Olivier Theatre (1997) by Feilden Clegg Bradley Studios
- The Orchard Building (2005) by Walters & Cohen
- The Art and Design Building (2017) by Feilden Clegg Bradley Studios

== Notable Bedalians ==
- Thomas Eckersley (1886–1959), theoretical physicist and engineer
- Robin Hill (1899–1991), plant biochemist
- Kathleen Merritt (1901–1985), musician and conductor
- Malcolm MacDonald (1901–1981), politician
- John Wyndham (1903–1969), novelist
- George Sanders (1906–1972), actor and Academy Award winner
- Frank Roberts (1907-1998), diplomat
- Mike Sadler (1920–2024), "founding" member of the SAS, MI6 officer
- Sir Peter Wright (born 1926), ballet dancer and director
- Michael Harris Caine (1927–1999), businessman
- Keith Clayton (1928–2013), geographer and environmental scientist
- Judith Herrin (born 1942), archaeologist and author
- Gyles Brandreth (born 1948), journalist, television presenter, politician
- Daniel Day-Lewis (born 1957), Oscar-winning actor
- Mary Ann Sieghart (born 1961), journalist and radio presenter
- David Armstrong-Jones, 2nd Earl of Snowdon (born 1961), member of the royal family
- Lady Sarah Chatto (born 1964), member of the royal family
- Minnie Driver (born 1970), actress
- Ceawlin Thynn, 8th Marquess of Bath (born 1974), business owner
- Natalia Tena (born 1984), actress and musician
- Lily Allen (born 1985), singer
- Cara Delevingne (born 1992), model and actress
