= Fydell Edmund Garrett =

British journalist and poet (1865–1907)

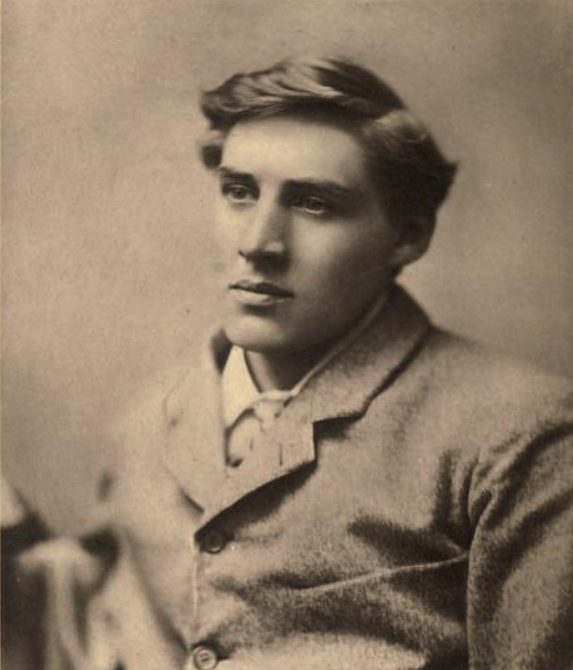
- Born: 20 July 1865; Elton, Derbyshire
- Died: 10 May 1907 (aged 41); Wiverton Acre, Brixton, Devon
- Occupation: Editor
- Years active: 1895-1899
- Employer: Cape Times
- Predecessor: J. Saxon Mill
- Successor: Frederick York St Leger

Fydell Edmund Garrett (20 July 1865 – 10 May 1907), also known as Edmund Garrett, was a British publicist, journalist and poet. He was returned as a Member of the Parliament of the Cape of Good Hope in 1898 for Victoria East constituency.

== Biography ==
Garrett was born on 20 July 1865, was fourth son of John Fisher Garrett, rector of Elton, Derbyshire, and his second wife, Mary, daughter of Godfrey Gray. His older half siblings included suffragist and designer Rhoda Garrett, who his mother was considered to have ill treated. He was educated at Rossall School and Trinity College, Cambridge, where he graduated B.A. in the summer term of 1887 with a third class in Classics. At the university he was more distinguished at the Cambridge Union, of which he was president in 1887, than in the schools.

On leaving the university Garrett joined the staff of the Pall Mall Gazette. After two years of work in London, he had symptoms of tuberculosis, and was subsequently sent to South Africa for a cure. This led to a temporary remission, and his visit to South Africa in the winter of 1889-90 led to other consequences important to his career.

The next four years were devoted to journalistic work in London, first for the Pall Mall Gazette, then, from 1893, for the Westminster Gazette, in the opening years of its career, in either case under the editorship of Garrett's friend, Sir Edward Cook. In 1894 he produced a translation of Henrik Ibsen's Brand into English verse in the original metres.

In April of 1895 Garrett returned to South Africa to become editor of the Cape Times, the leading English newspaper in the sub-continent. He was not only editor of the paper but the principal writer in it, and came to play an important part in the coverage of crisis which was to unfold in southern Africa over the next years, including the Jameson Raid, the abortive rebellion in Johannesburg, the struggle between Rhodes and the Bond at the Cape, and between Kruger and the Uitlanders in the Transvaal, the Bloemfontein conference, and the growing tension between Great Britain and the South African Republic (the government of the Transvaal).

Garrett returned to the Cape general election of 1898 as a member of Victoria East. He took a place in the Cape Legislative Assembly. In the two sessions preceding the war, he was a speaker on the British side. He supported Rhodes and the policy of Lord (then Sir Alfred) Alfred Milner. He dealed with the susceptibilities of his Afrikaner opponents. He advocated for a policy for a United South Africa: autonomous in its own affairs, but remaining part of the British Empire. The physical strain was too much for his constitution. In the summer of 1899, his health broke down permanently.

Obliged to leave South Africa, in an advanced stage of tuberculosis, just before the outbreak of the Second Boer War, he spent the next two or three years in sanatoria, first on the European continent and then in England. He had already in January 1900 resigned the editorship of the Cape Times, and in 1902 he also gave up his seat in the house of assembly. He still wrote short articles and poems time to time.

In March 1903 Garrett married Ellen Marriage; they had met as a fellow patients at the East Anglian Sanatorium in Wiston, Essex. Marriage had fully recovered from her neurasthenia, and it was thanks to her care and devotion that Garrett's life was prolonged for another four years, despite his complete physical prostration.

In June 1904 the Garretts moved to a cottage, Wiverton Acre, near Plympton, Devon. Garrett died there on 10 May 1907, and was buried in the churchyard at Brixton, Devon. To the last he occasionally wrote, chiefly on South Africa. Within a month of his death he contributed to the Standard (12 April) an article on "The Boer in the Saddle".

== Criticism of theosophy ==
From 29 October to 8 November 1894 The Westminster Gazette published a series of articles by Garrett entitled Isis Very Much Unveiled, Being the Story of the Great Mahatma Hoax. They were collected into a booklet which caused much controversy. Garrett exposed the fraud of the Mahatma Letters and quarrels in the Theosophical Society after the death of Helena Blavatsky. For the expose, Garrett had received Theosophical documents from Walter Gorn Old.

== Works ==
- The Last Trek, written on the occasion of President Kruger's funeral progress from Cape Town to Pretoria (Spectator, 10 December 1904)
- "Rhodes and Milner" . The Empire and the century. London: John Murray. 1905. pp. 478–520.
- In Memoriam F. W. R. (Frank Rhodes), (Westminster Gazette, 27 October 1905)
- A Millionaire's Epitaph (Alfred Beit), (Westminster Gazette, 20 July 1906)

Garrett wrote an epitaph inspired by the famous epitaph of Simonides at Thermopylae:

Tell England you who pass our monument
Men who died serving Her, rest here, content

A similar epithet is to be found engraved on all the obelisks which at Elandslaagte and on many another battlefield surmount the graves of officers and troopers in the Imperial Light Horse who fell during the Second Boer War (1899–1902).

Tell England, ye who pass this monument,
We, who died serving her, rest here content.

In the immediate decades after the Boer War it was well known, and some First World War memorials, such as the Southport War Memorial carry similar epitaphs. Garrett was very pleased when his longer epitaph, for Boers and Britons buried side by side, was quoted by G. P. Wessels in a reconciliation speech. Besides the works already mentioned Garrett published:

- The Story of an African Crisis (1897)
- Isis Very Much Unveiled: Being the Story of the Great Mahatma Hoax (1894)
- A chapter, "Rhodes and Milner", to The Empire and the Century (1905)

The Garrett Colonial Library, which was founded by colonial admirers in his memory, was opened at the Cambridge Union Society on 23 May 1911. A pencil portrait by Sir Edward Poynter was in 1912 in the possession of his widow.
