= Convallarin =

Names
- Other names Convallarinum

Identifiers
CAS Number	8001-64-7
CompTox Dashboard (EPA)	DTXSID701053895

Properties
Chemical formula	Unknown
Appearance	Rectangular prisms or crystalline powder
- Except where otherwise noted, data are given for materials in their standard state (at 25 °C [77 °F], 100 kPa). verify (what is ?) Infobox references

Convallarin is a crystalline glucoside extracted from the Lily of the Valley plant (Convallaria majalis).

It may be obtained from the alcoholic extract of the residue from which the convallamarin has been removed with water. The alcoholic solution is treated with lead acetate, the filtrate freed from lead by hydrogen sulfide, and crystallised by concentration. An aqueous solution froths like soap and water when shaken. By long boiling with diluted acids it is split up into glucose and convallaretin.

It is probably a mixture of convallamarin, convallamaretin and convallatoxin.

== Action and uses ==
Convallarin causes nausea and diarrhea.
