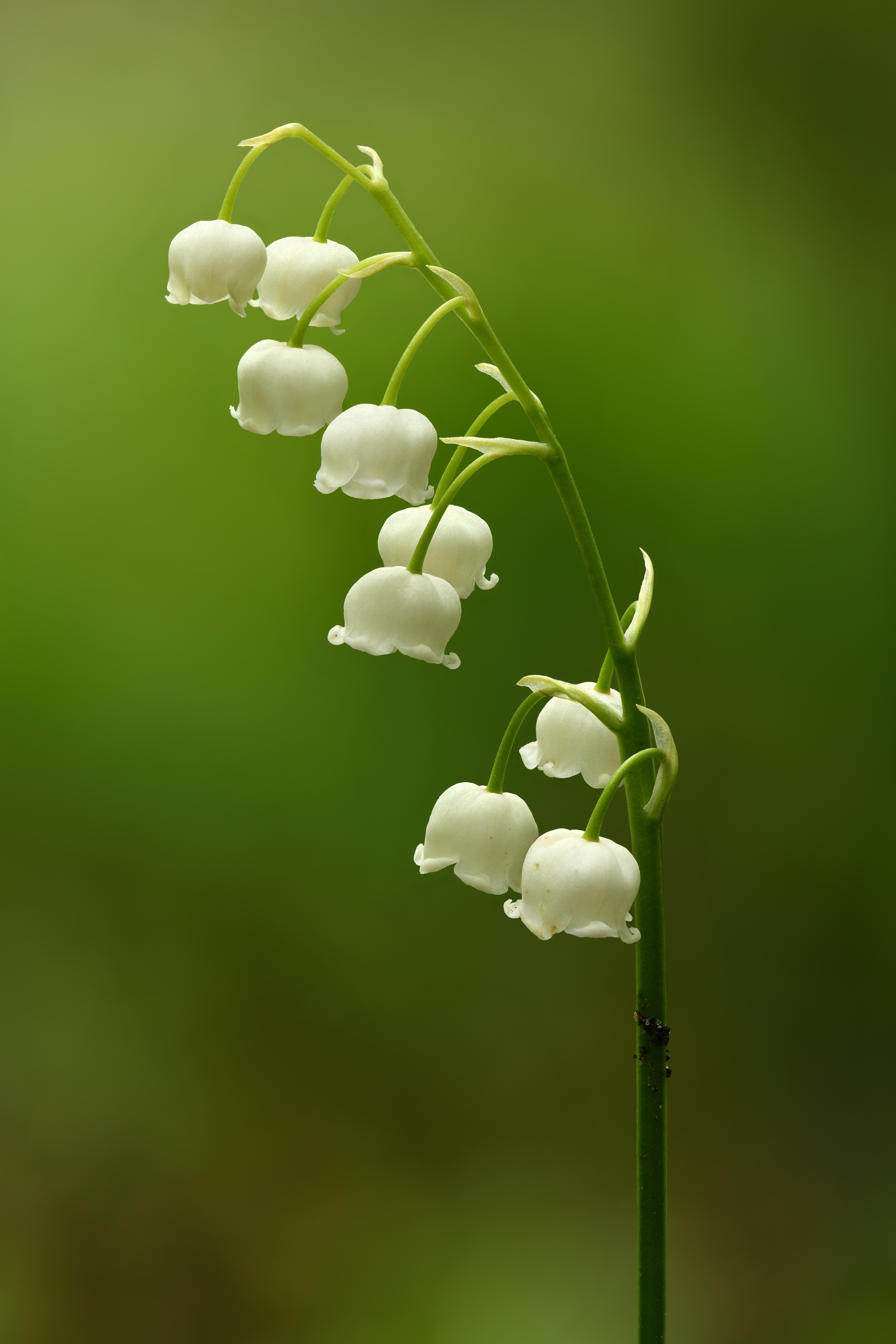
- Inflorescence (image taken in Keila, Estonia)
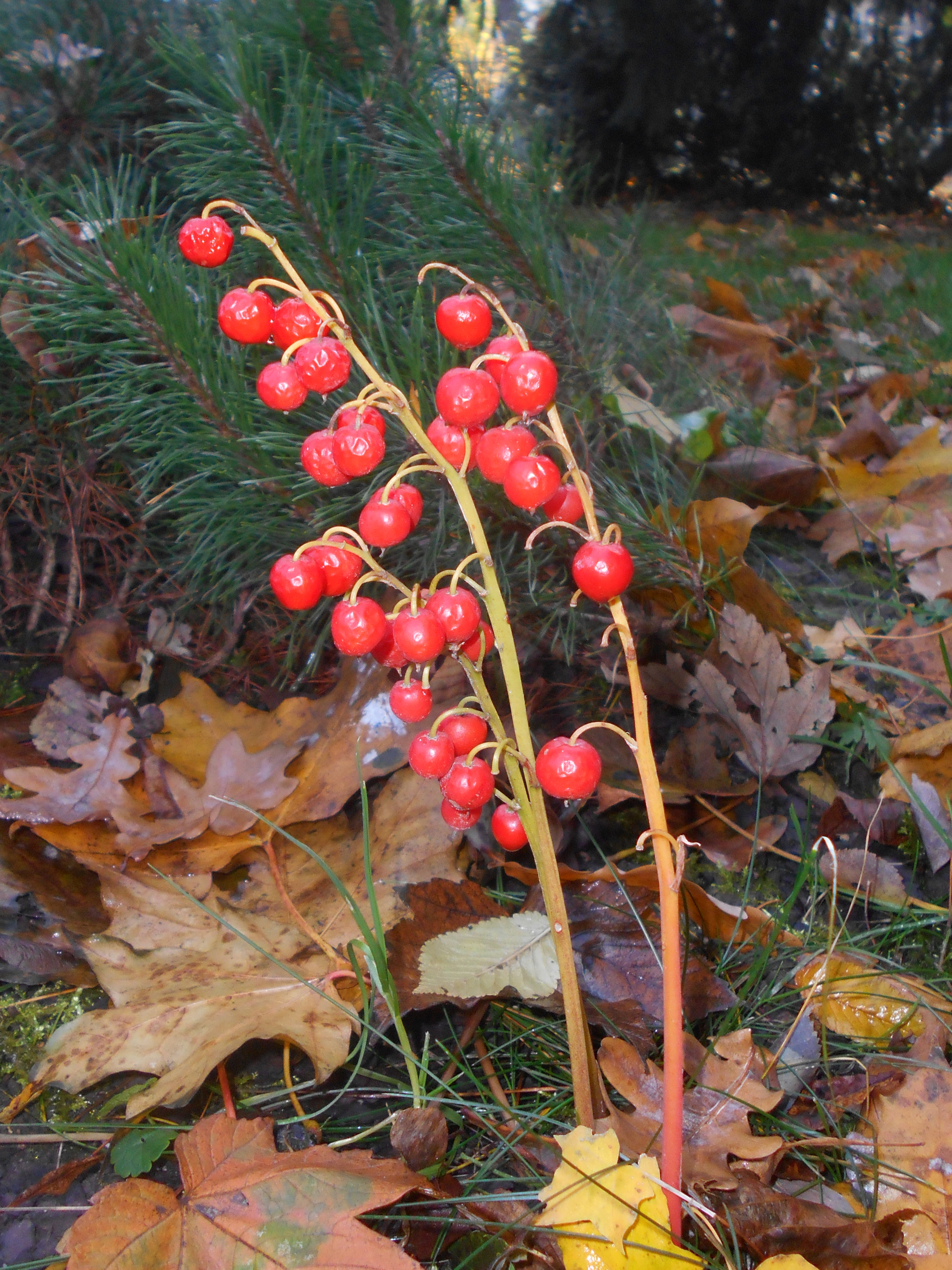
- Fruit (image taken in Poland)

Conservation status
- Least Concern (IUCN 3.1)

Scientific classification
- Kingdom: Plantae
- Clade: Tracheophytes
- Clade: Angiosperms
- Clade: Monocots
- Order: Asparagales
- Family: Asparagaceae
- Subfamily: Convallarioideae
- Genus: Convallaria
- Species: C. majalis

Binomial name
- Convallaria majalis L.

= Lily of the valley =

Lily-of-the-valley

Species of flowering plant in the asparagus family

Lily-of-the-valley (Convallaria majalis), also written as lily of the valley, is a Eurasian woodland plant. Growing to 15–35 cm (6–14 in) tall, the plant produces sweetly scented racemes of pendulous, bell-shaped white flowers.

Due to the concentration of potent cardiac glycosides (cardenolides), the plant is highly poisonous if consumed. It is used in floristry and perfumes have been based on its scent, although no aromatic extract can be produced from the plant itself. It has also been referenced in works of art and literature.

== Description ==
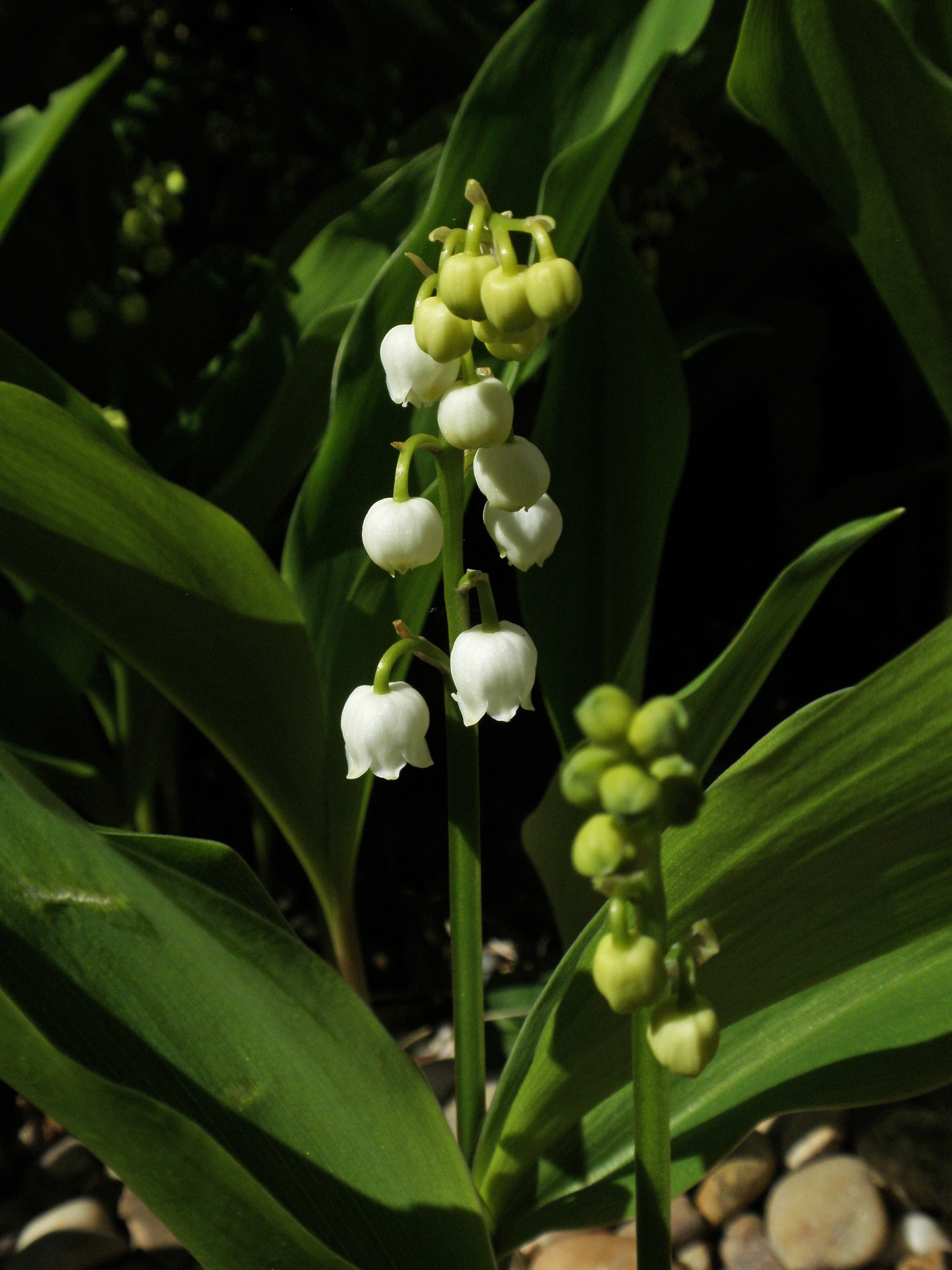
Foliage and flowers

Convallaria majalis is a herbaceous perennial plant that often forms extensive colonies by spreading underground stems called rhizomes. New upright shoots are formed at the ends of stolons in summer. These grow in the spring into new leafy shoots that still remain connected to the other shoots under ground. The stems grow to 15–35 cm (6–14 in) tall, with two (rarely three) leaves 5–20 cm (2–8 in) long and 3–7 cm (1–3 in) broad. The flowering stems have a one-sided raceme of six to twelve pendulous flowers on the upper part of the stem.

The flowers have six white tepals (rarely pink, as in the cultivar Convallaria majalis 'Rosea', which has pink tepals), fused at the base to form a bell shape with reflexed tips; they are 5–10 mm (0.2–0.4 in) diameter, and are sweetly scented. Flowering is in late spring, typically May to June in Britain. The fruit is a poisonous small orange-red berry approximately 5–7 mm (0.2–0.3 in) diameter, containing an average of 3.9 large whitish to brownish seeds that dry to a clear translucent round bead 1–3 mm (0.04–0.12 in) wide. The fruit persists for an average of 47.5 days. The fruit averages 85.8% water, and their dry weight includes 14.6% carbohydrates and 1.3% lipids. Plants are self-incompatible, and colonies consisting of a single clone do not set seed.

== Taxonomy ==
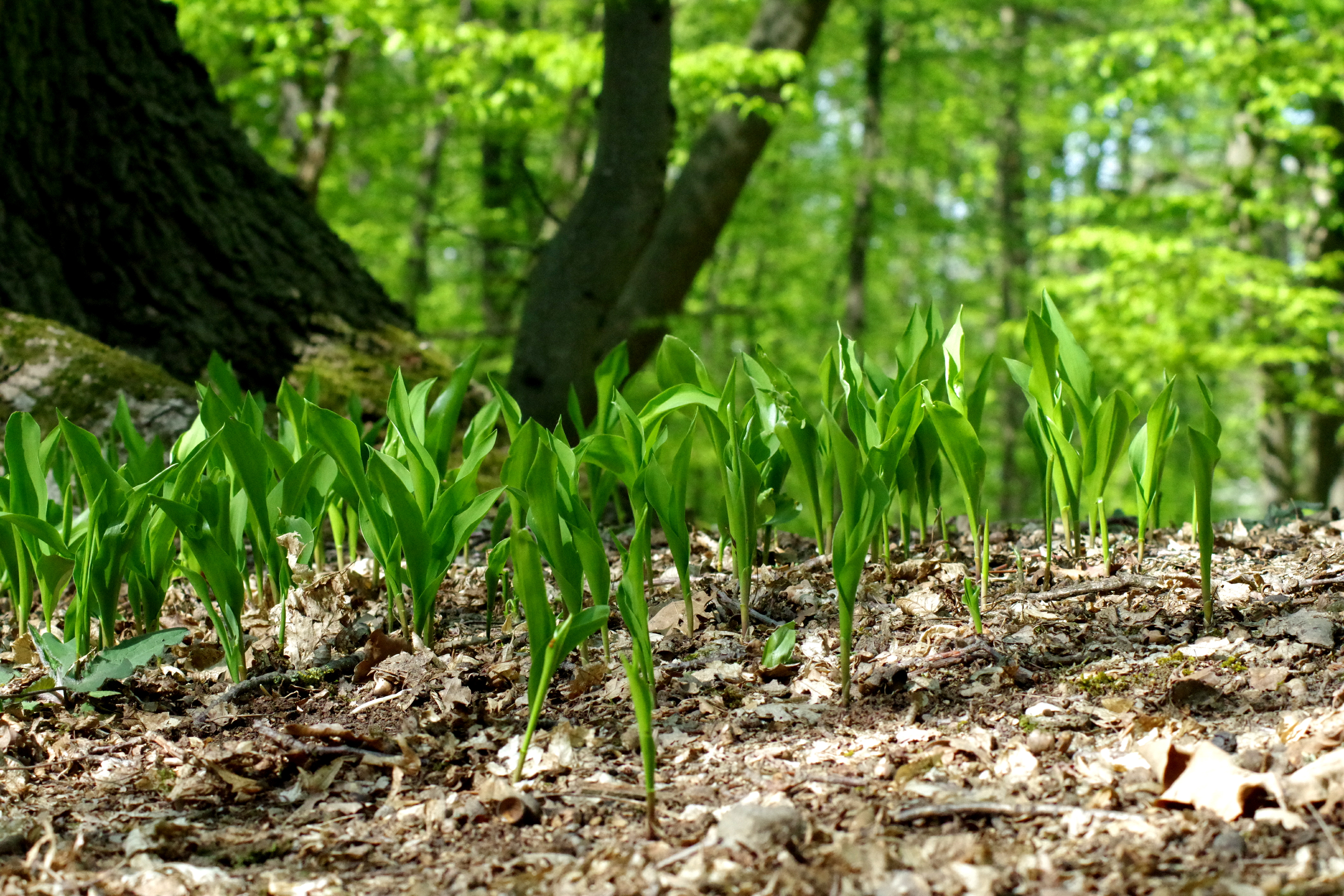
Natural habitat in central Germany

In the APG III system, the genus is placed in the family Asparagaceae, subfamily Convallarioideae (formerly the family Ruscaceae). It was formerly placed in its own family Convallariaceae, and, like many lilioid monocots, before that in the lily family, Liliaceae.

In the past, it was widely treated in three varieties, but these are now separated out as distinct species.

- Convallaria majalis var. majalis, from Europe and western Asia, with white midribs on the flowers — now Convallaria majalis sensu stricto.
- Convallaria majalis var. keiskei, from China and Japan, with red fruit and bowl-shaped flowers — now Convallaria keiskei.
- Convallaria majalis var. montana – from the southern Appalachian Mountains, with green-tinted midribs on the flowers — now Convallaria pseudomajalis.

C. transcaucasica is recognised as a distinct species, subspecies, or variety of C. majalis by some authorities, but is not generally accepted as distinct. The species formerly called Convallaria japonica is now classified as Ophiopogon japonicus.

=== Etymology ===
The genus name Convallaria (coined by Carl Linnaeus) derives from lilium convallium, the term used in the Vulgate translation of Song of Songs.

== Distribution ==
Convallaria majalis is native to Europe, Western Asia, and Northern Asia. In Europe, it largely avoids the Mediterranean margin, and is also absent from Ireland as a native species, though is naturalised there.

Like many perennial flowering plants, C. majalis exhibits dual reproductive modes by producing offspring asexually by vegetative means and sexually by seed, produced via the fusion of gametes.

== Ecology ==
Convallaria majalis is a plant of partial shade, and a mesophile type that prefers warm summers. It grows widely in both acidic soils and alkaline soils, liking soils that are silty or sandy, but also locally in wet fen soils, with preferably a plentiful amount of humus. It is a Euroasiatic and suboceanic species that occurs from sea level up to 490 m (1,600 ft) altitude in Great Britain, and in central and southern Europe up to 2,300 m (7,500 ft) altitude.

Convallaria majalis is used as a food plant by the larvae of some moth and butterfly (Lepidoptera) species including the grey chi. Adults and larvae of the leaf beetle Lilioceris merdigera are also able to tolerate the cardenolides and thus feed on the leaves.

The fruit is sometimes removed by graniviorous rodents, consuming most of the seeds but only a small proportion of the fruit pulp. Their hoarding of both seeds and whole fruit has been observed. As some seeds inevitably escape predation, they also act as seed dispersers.

== Cultivars ==
Convallaria majalis is widely grown in gardens for its scented flowers and ground-covering abilities in shady locations. It has gained the Royal Horticultural Society's Award of Garden Merit. In favourable conditions it can form large colonies.

Various cultivars are grown, selected for double flowers, rose-coloured flowers, variegated foliage, and larger size than the typical species.

- C. majalis 'Albostriata' has white-striped leaves
- C. majalis 'Green Tapestry', 'Haldon Grange', 'Hardwick Hall', 'Hofheim', 'Marcel', 'Variegata' and 'Vic Pawlowski's Gold' are other variegated cultivars
- C. majalis 'Berlin Giant' and C. majalis 'Géant de Fortin' (syn. 'Fortin's Giant') are larger-growing cultivars
- C. majalis 'Flore Pleno' has double flowers.
- C. majalis 'Rosea' sometimes found under the name C. majalis var. rosea, has pink flowers.
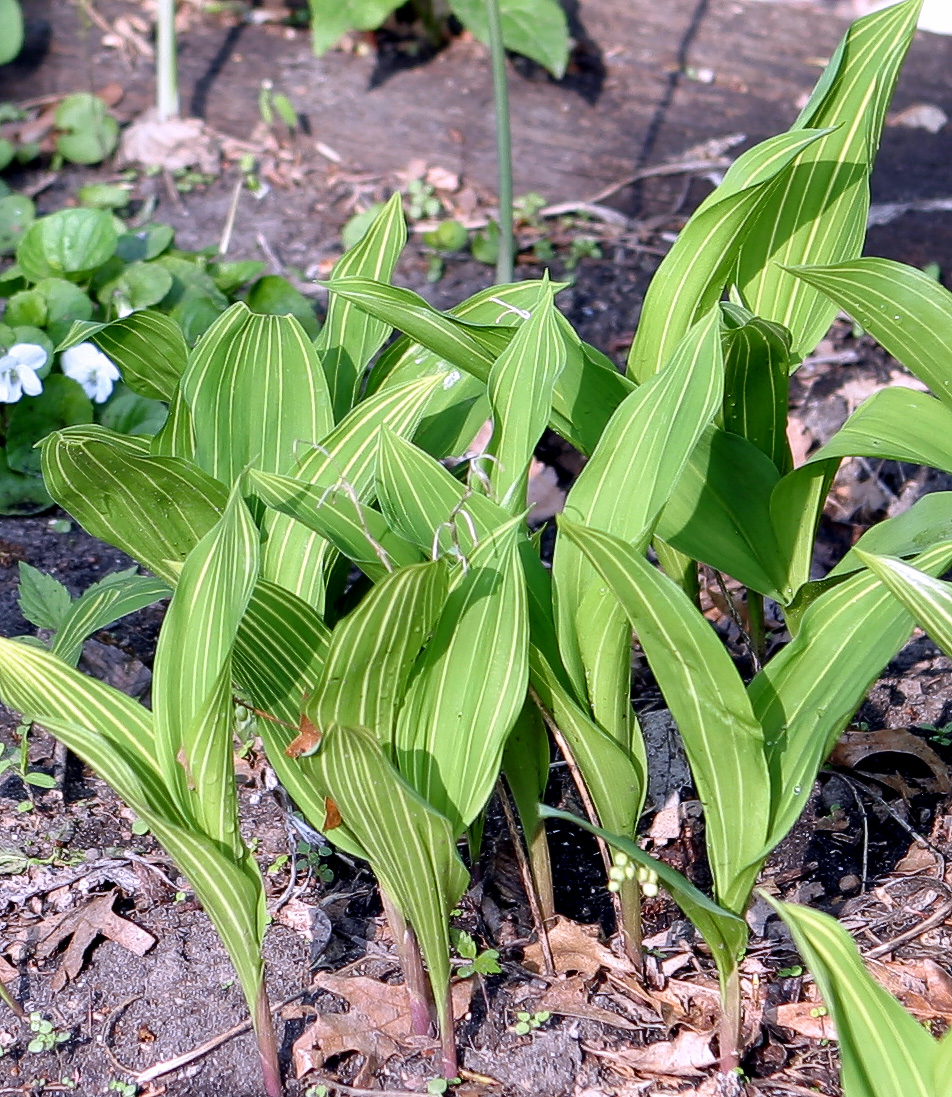
A variegated cultivar early in spring

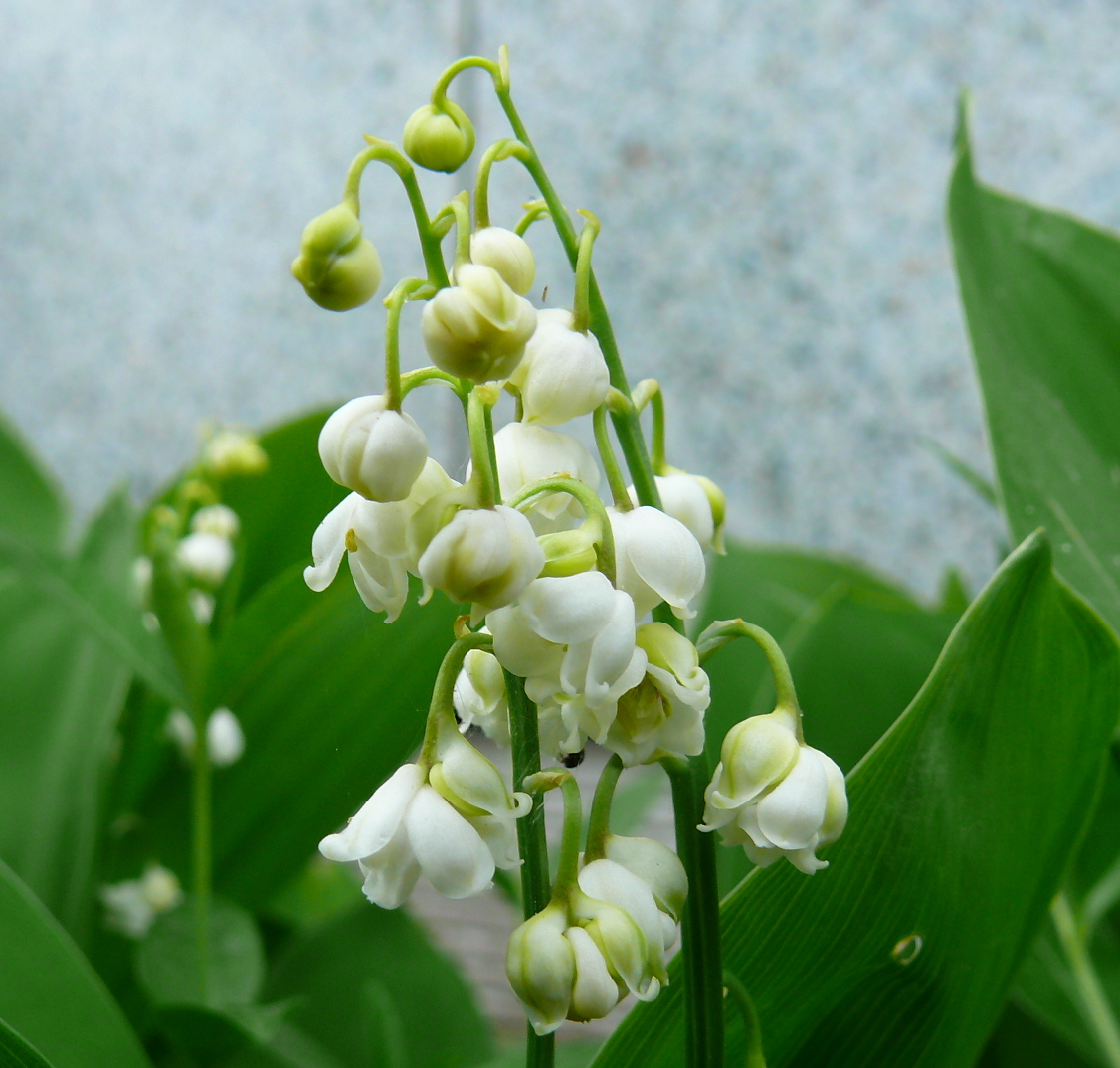
Double-flowered 'Flore Pleno'

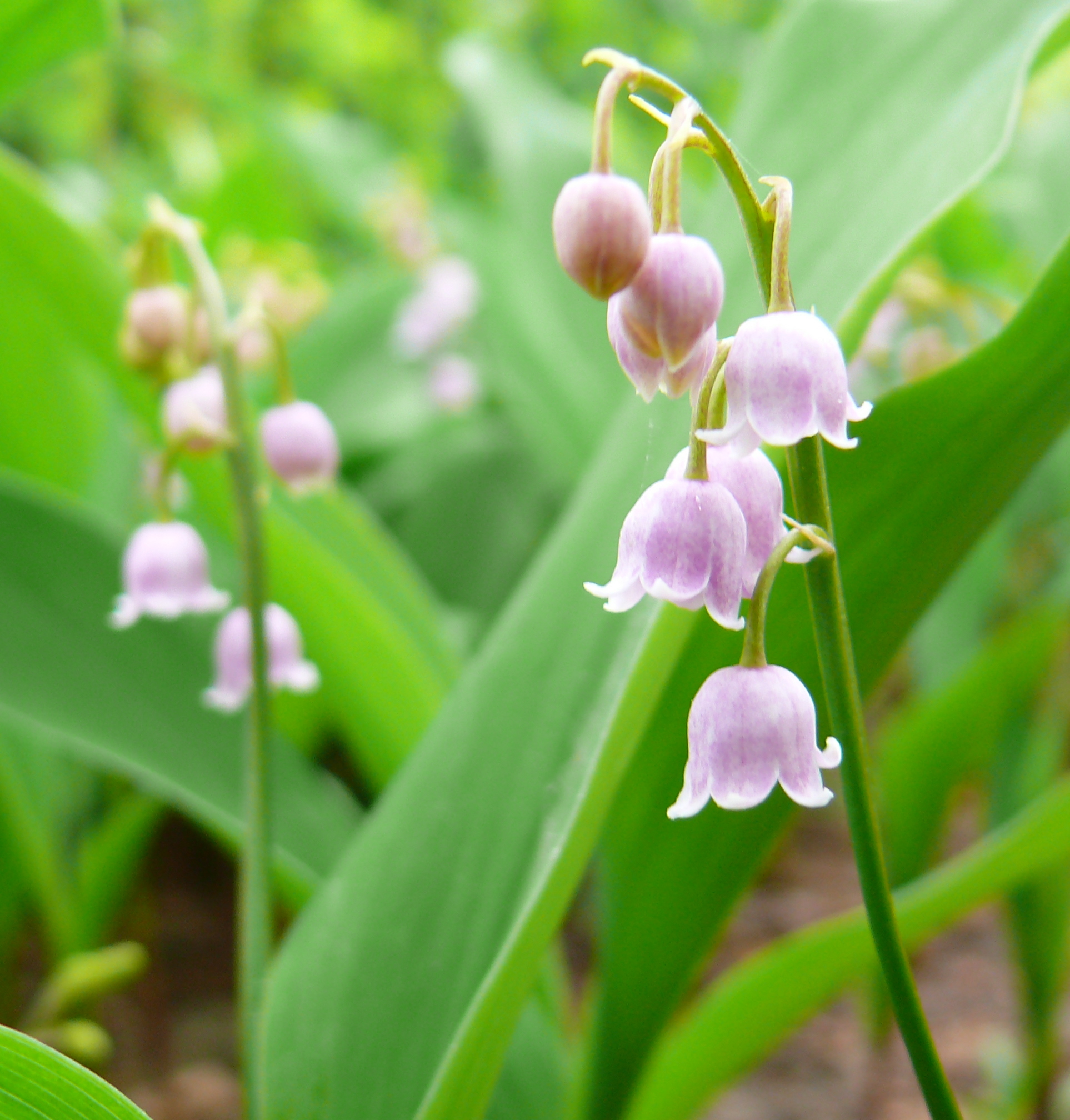
'Rosea'

Traditionally, Convallaria majalis has been grown in pots and winter forced to provide flowers during the winter months, both in potted plants and as cut flowers.

== Chemistry ==
General chemical make-up of a cardiac glycoside

Roughly 38 different cardiac glycosides (cardenolides) – which are highly toxic if consumed by humans or animals – occur in the plant, including:

- convallarin
- convallamarin
- convallatoxin
- convallotoxoloside
- convallosid
- neoconvalloside
- glucoconvalloside
- majaloside
- convallatoxon
- corglycon
- cannogenol-3-O-α-L-rhamnoside
- cannogenol-3-O-β-D-allomethyloside
- cannogenol-3-O-6-deoxy-β-D-allosido-β-D-glucoside,
- cannogenol-3-O-6-deoxy-β-D-allosido-α-L-rhamnoside,
- strophanthidin-3-O-6-deoxy-β-D-allosido-α-L-rhamnoside,
- strophanthidin-3-O-6-deoxy-β-D-allosido-α-L-arabinoside,
- strophanthidin-3-O-α-L-rhamnosido-2-β-D-glucoside,
- sarmentogenin-3-O-6-deoxy-β-D-allosido-α-L-rhamnoside
- sarmentogenin-3-O-6-deoxy-β-D-guloside
- 19-hydroxy-sarmentogenin-3-O-α-L-rhamnoside,
- 19-hydroxy-sarmentogenin
- arabinosido-6-deoxyallose
- lokundjoside

The scent of lily-of-the-valley, specifically the ligand bourgeonal, was once thought to attract mammalian sperm. The 2003 discovery of this phenomenon prompted research into odour reception, but a 2012 study demonstrated instead that at high concentrations, bourgeonal imitated the role of progesterone in stimulating sperm to swim (chemotaxis), a process unrelated to odour reception.

== Toxicity ==
All parts of the plant are potentially poisonous, including the red berries, which may be attractive to children. If ingested, the plant can cause abdominal pain, nausea, vomiting, and irregular heartbeats.

== Uses ==
=== Weddings and other celebrations ===
Lily-of-the-valley has been used in weddings and off-season can be very expensive. Lily-of-the-valley was featured in the bridal bouquet at the wedding of Prince William and Catherine Middleton.

At the beginning of the 20th century, it became tradition in France to sell lily-of-the-valley on international Labour Day, 1 May (also called La Fête du Muguet or Lily of the Valley Day) by labour organisations and private persons without paying sales tax (on that day only) as a symbol of spring.

Lily-of-the-valley is worn in Helston (Cornwall, UK) on Flora Day (8 May each year, see Furry Dance) representing the coming of "the May-o" and the summer. There is also a song sung in pubs around Cornwall (and on Flora Day in Cadgwith, near Helston) called "Lily of the Valley"; the song, strangely, came from the Jubilee Singers from Fisk University in Nashville, Tennessee.

=== Folk medicine ===
The plant has been used in folk medicine for centuries. There is a reference to "Lilly of the valley water" in Robert Louis Stevenson's 1886 novel Kidnapped, where it is said to be "good against the Gout", and that it "comforts the heart and strengthens the memory" and "restores speech to those that have the dumb palsey". There is no scientific evidence that lily of the valley has any effective medicinal uses for treating human diseases.

== In culture ==
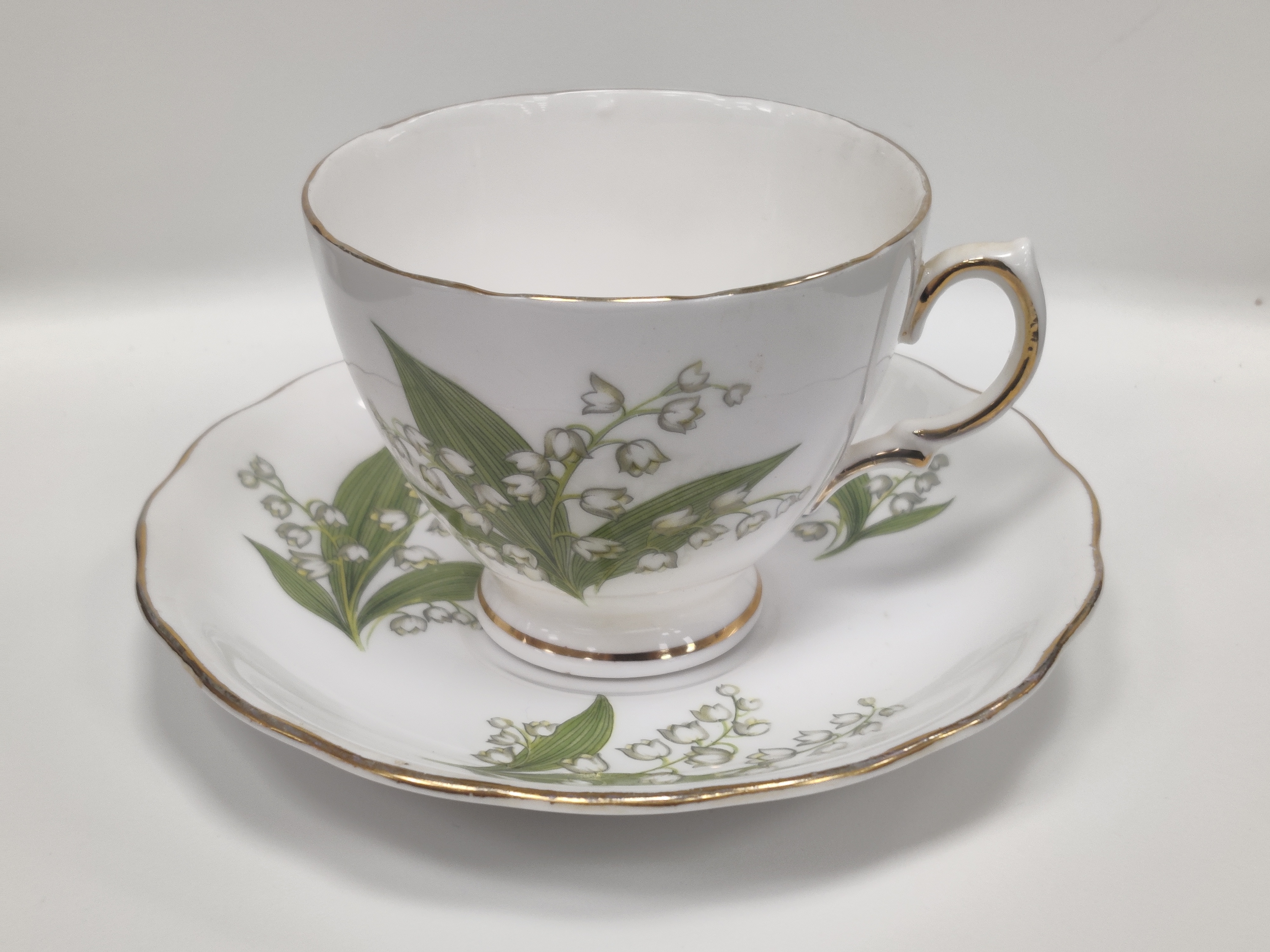
A Royal Vale cup and saucer decorated with a Lily-of-the-valley motif

The lily-of-the-valley was the national flower of Yugoslavia, and it also became the national flower of Finland in 1967.

In the "language of flowers", the lily of the valley signifies the return of happiness.

=== Common names ===
The name "lily of the valley" is apparently a reference to the biblical phrase "lily of the valleys" (sometimes also translated as "lily of the valley"), from Song of Songs 2:1 (שׁוֹשַׁנַּת הָעֲמָקִים). European herbalists' use of the phrase to refer to a specific plant species seems to have appeared relatively late, in the 15th or 16th century.

Other common names include May bells, Our Lady's tears, and Mary's tears. Its French name, muguet, sometimes appearing in the names of perfumes imitating the flower's scent. In pre-modern England, the plant was known as glovewort (as it was a wort used to create a salve for sore hands), or Apollinaris (according to a legend that it was discovered by Apollo).

=== Perfume ===
In 1956, the French firm Dior produced a fragrance simulating lily-of-the-valley, which was Christian Dior's favourite flower. Diorissimo was designed by Edmond Roudnitska. Although it has since been reformulated, it is considered a classic. Because no natural aromatic extract can be produced from lily-of-the-valley, its scent must be recreated synthetically; while Diorissimo originally achieved this with hydroxycitronellal, the European Chemicals Agency now considers this a skin sensitiser and its use has been restricted.

Other perfumes imitating or based on the flower include Henri Robert's Muguet de Bois (1936), Penhaligon's Lily of the Valley (1976), and Olivia Giacobetti's En Passant (2000).

=== In media ===
The lily of the valley is represented both literally and symbolically in art, literature, music, and other media. The flower is the theme of a poem by Paul Laurence Dunbar, and Tchaikovsky wrote the poem "Lilies of the Valley" (Ландыши) in December 1878 while in Florence. In Anton Chekhov's 1898 short story "A Doctor's Visit", drops of convallaria are mentioned as medicine. Marc Chagall produced the painting Lillies-of-the-Valley in 1916.

Lily of the valley was reputedly Queen Elizabeth II's favourite flower, and so it was the theme of the poem "Floral Tribute" by the Poet Laureate Simon Armitage, written in memory of the Queen and published in the week after her death. Previously, an eponymous song was written by English rock band Queen and released as part of the 1974 studio album Sheer Heart Attack.

"Face Off", the finale of the fourth season of the television series Breaking Bad, features the use of berries from lily of the valley as poison because the symptoms are similar to ricin poisoning. In the third episode of Outlander, children are revealed to have been dying after confusing lily of the valley for garlic and eating it.

== Gallery ==
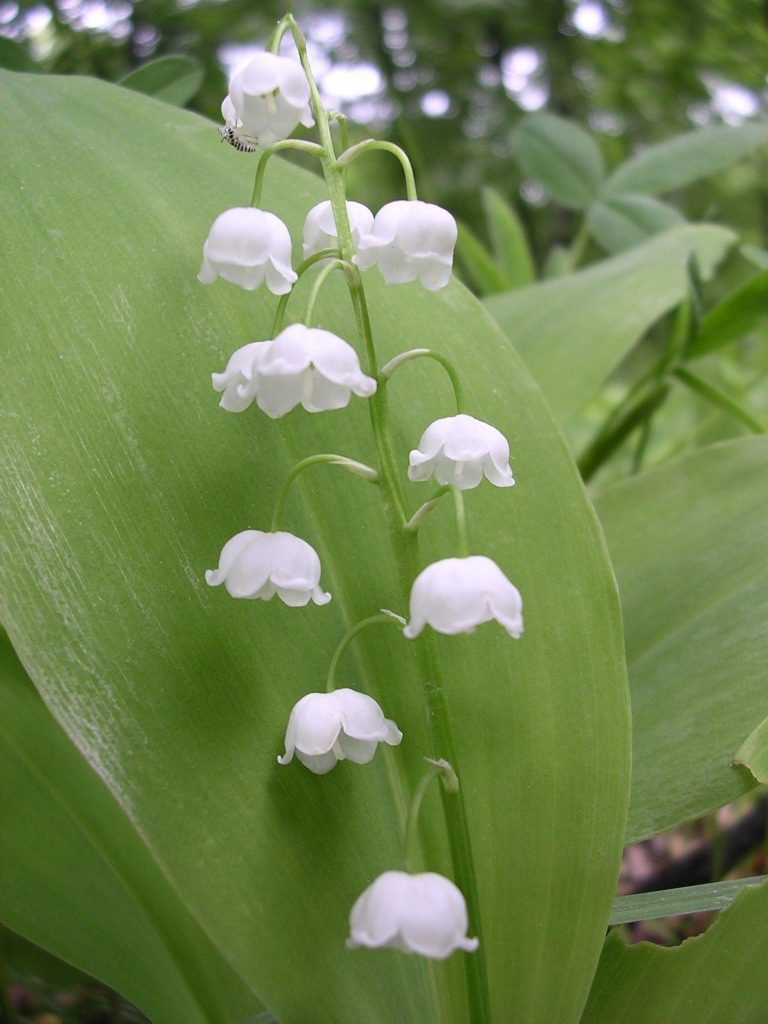
Convallaria close-up

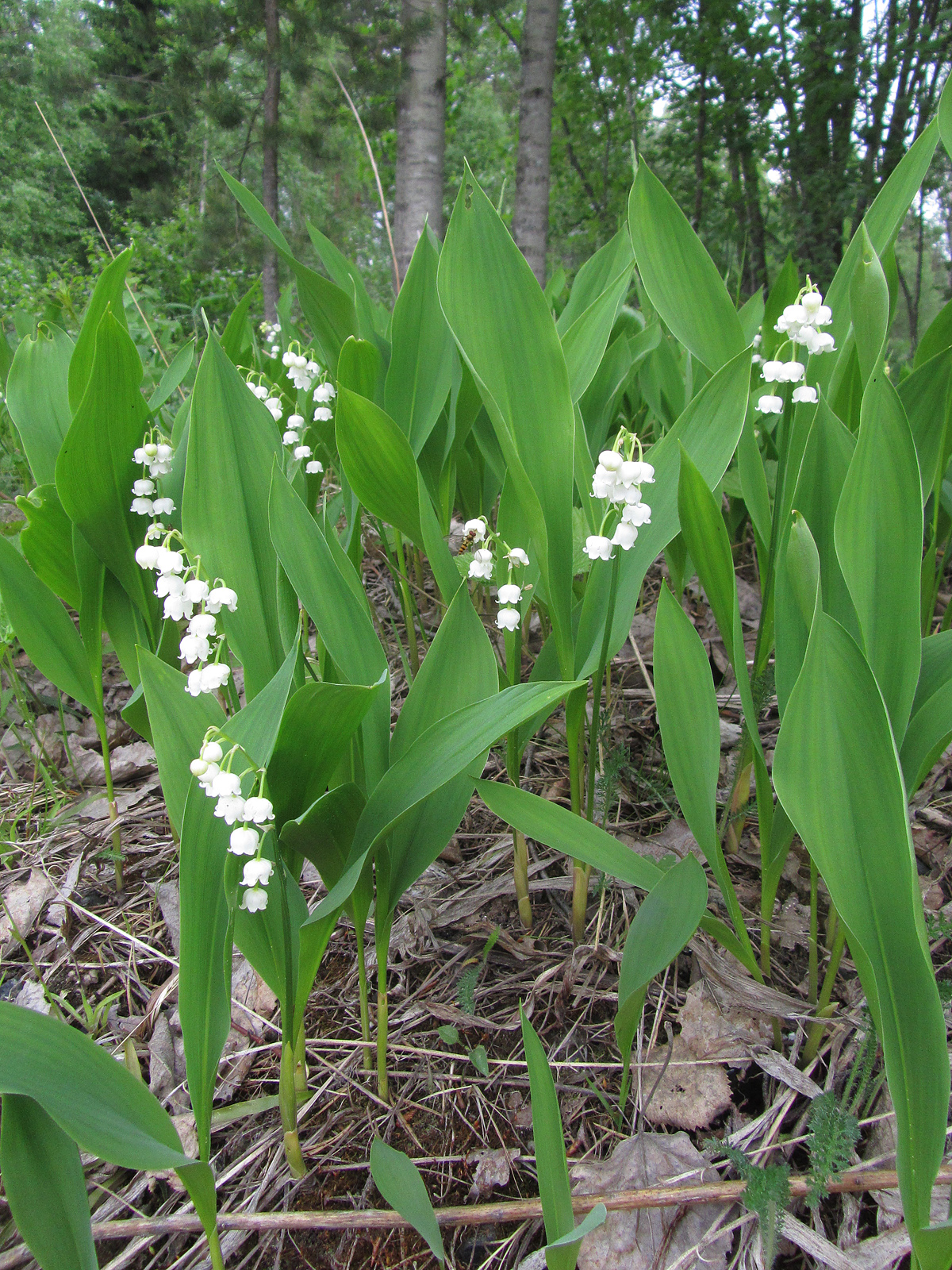
Convallarias in Kemi in early June

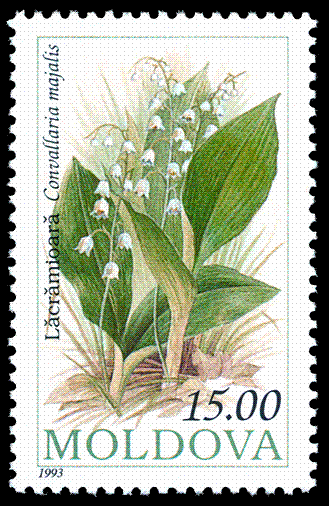
Moldovan stamp

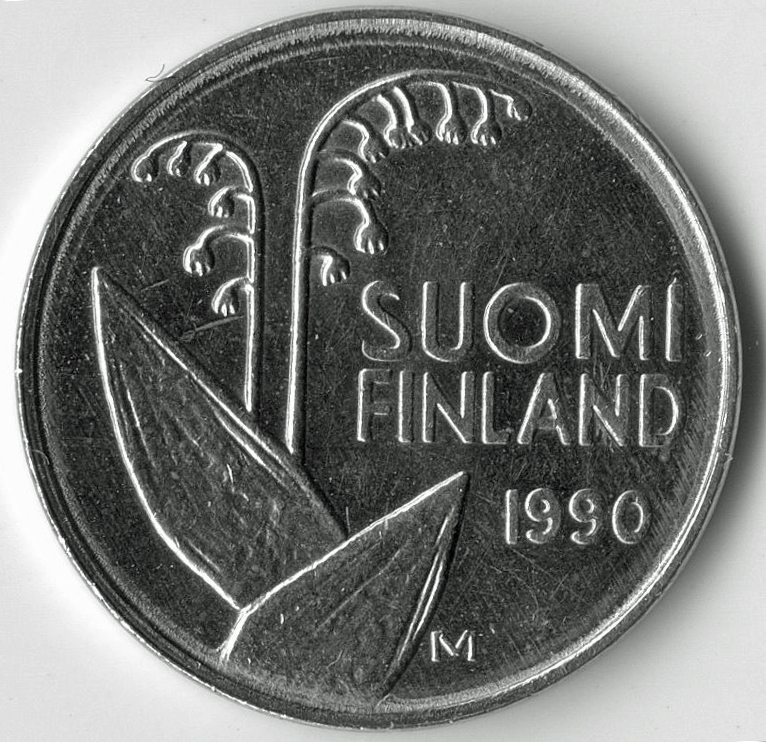
Finnish 10 penny coin with the Convallaria engraving

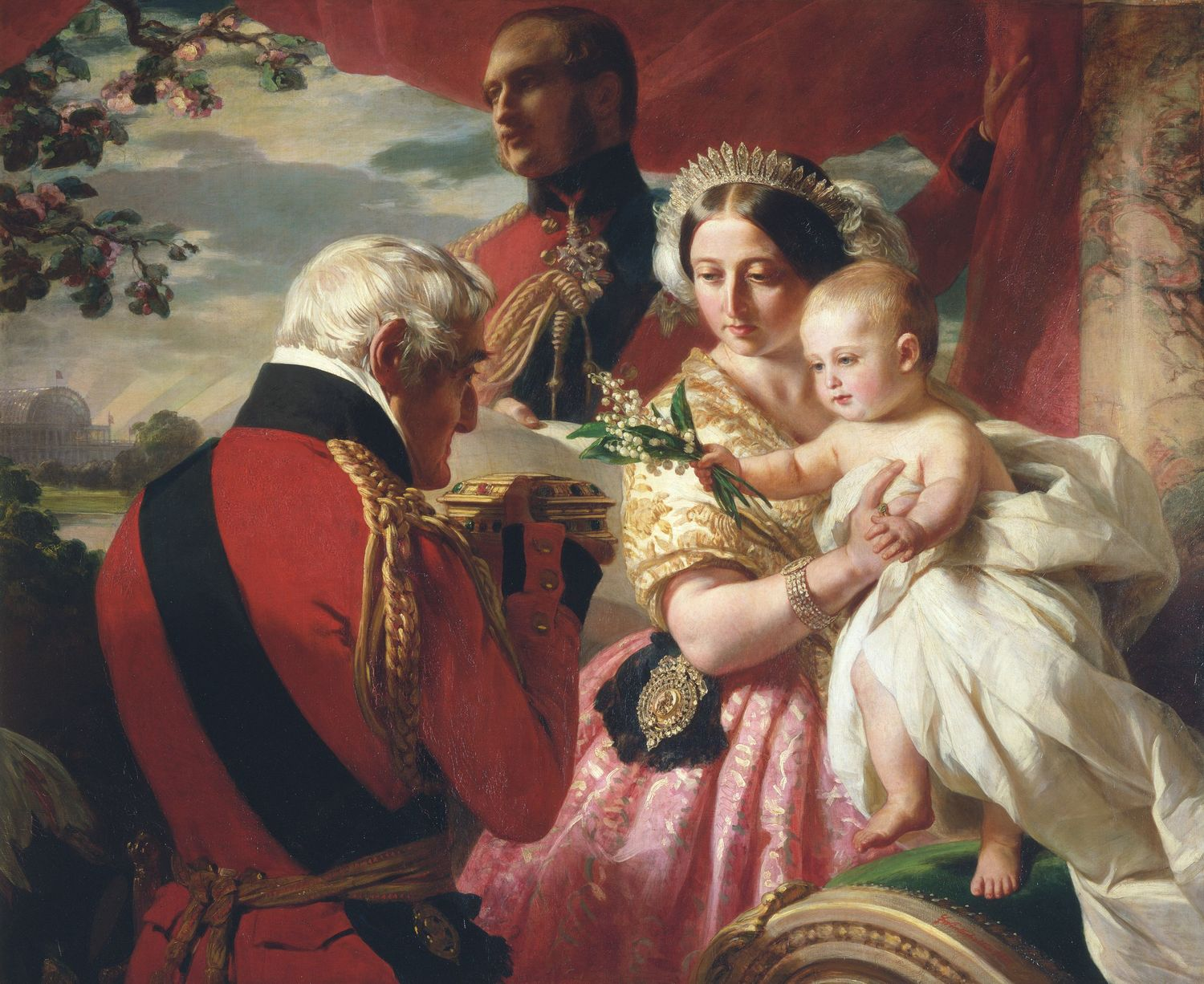
The First of May 1851 by Franz Xaver Winterhalter

Lunner (Norway) municipal coat of arms

== See also ==
- List of plants known as lily

== Bibliography ==
- Ehrlén, Johan; Eriksson, Ove (1993). "Toxicity in fleshy fruits: a non-adaptive trait?". Oikos. 66 (1): 107–113. doi:10.2307/3545202. ISSN 0030-1299. JSTOR 3545202.
- Ehrlén, Johan; Eriksson, Ove (1991). "Phenological variation in fruit characteristics in vertebrate-dispersed plants". Oecologia. 86 (4): 463–470. doi:10.1007/BF00318311. ISSN 0029-8549.
