= Convallaria japonica =

Convallaria japonica can refer to the following plant species:

- Convallaria japonica Greene, a synonym of Convallaria keiskei Miq.
- Convallaria japonica Thunb., a synonym of Ophiopogon japonicus (Thunb.) Ker Gawl.
