= Clérey-la-Côte =

- Commune
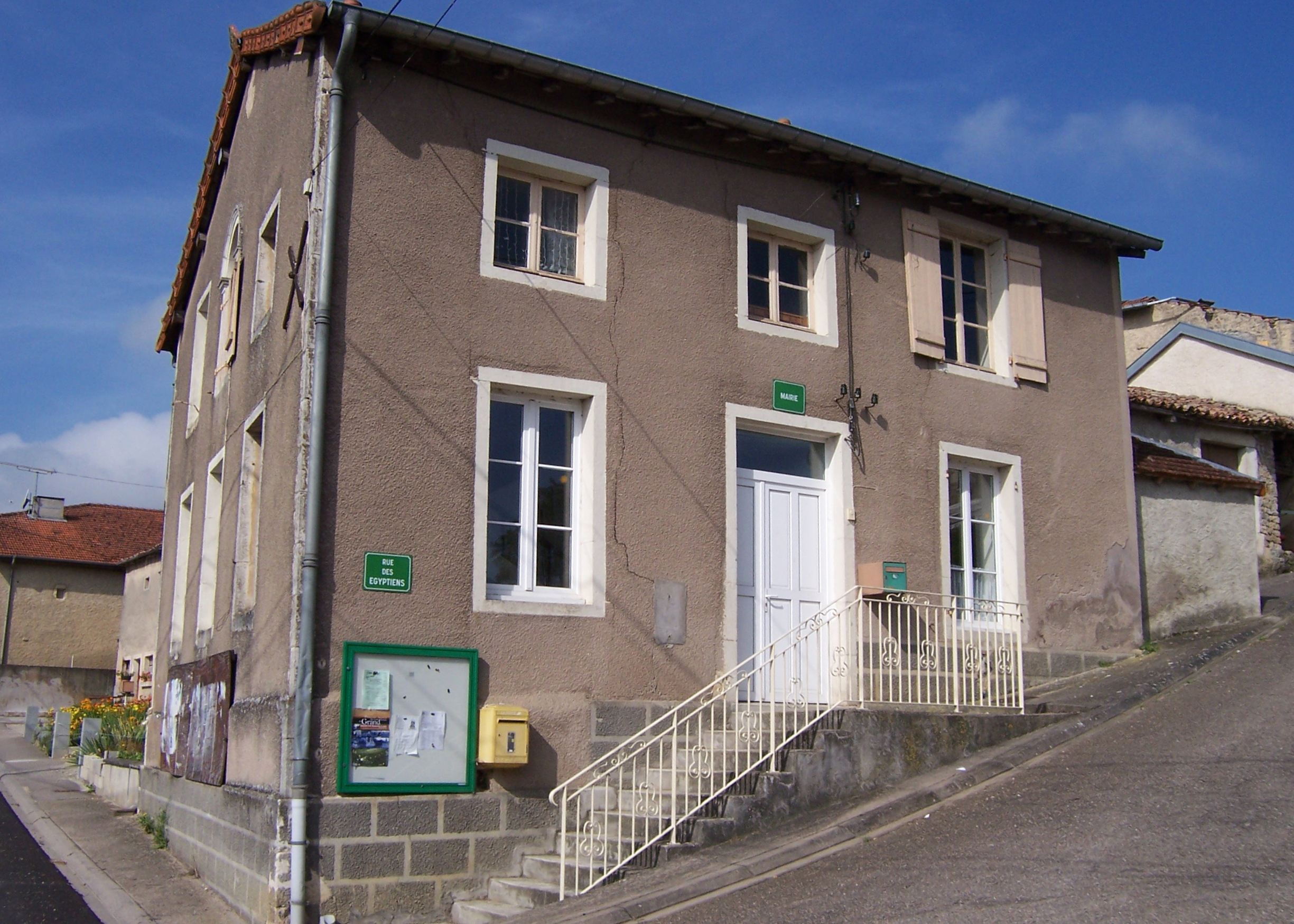
- The town hall in Clérey-la-Côte
- Location of Clérey-la-Côte
- Location within France Location within Grand Est
- Coordinates: 48°28′59″N 5°45′24″E
- Country: France
- Region: Grand Est
- Department: Vosges
- Arrondissement: Neufchâteau
- Canton: Neufchâteau
- Intercommunality: CC l'Ouest Vosgien

Government
  - Mayor (2020–2026): Daniel Fresnais
- Area^{1}: 3.18 km^{2} (1.23 sq mi)
- Highest elevation: 427 m (1,401 ft)
- Lowest elevation: 272 m (892 ft)
- Population (2023): 25
  - Density: 7.9/km^{2} (20/sq mi)
- Time zone: UTC+01:00 (CET)
  - Summer (DST): UTC+02:00 (CEST)
- INSEE/Postal code: 88107 /88630
- ^{1} French Land Register data, which excludes lakes, ponds, glaciers > 1 km^{2} (0.386 sq mi or 247 acres) and river estuaries.

Clérey-la-Côte (French pronunciation: [kleʁɛ la kot]) is a commune in the Vosges department in Grand Est in northeastern France.

== Geography ==
Clérey-la-côte borders the Meuse and Meurthe-et-Moselle. These three departments conjoin nearby at a site called le Site de 3 Bornes (three markers), designated by an ancient stone marker in the forest. It is the only place where three Lorraine departments touch.

The village forms part of the canton of Neufchâteau. The birthplace of Joan of Arc lies 7 km (4.3 mi) away at Domrémy-la-Pucelle. It is also 55 km (34 mi) from Nancy near Colombey-les-Belles, and halfway between Toul and Neufchâteau.

Of modest size, the village sits atop a hill with an altitude of 427 meters. Its southern hillside is exposed, offering an expansive panorama of the valley below. The village forms a part of the Côtes de Meuses, the micro-climate of which is similar to that of the Mediterranean side of France. Here one can typically find fauna and flora that exist in a Mediterranean climate.

The hill is dominated by the village's communal forest: composed of Oaks, Musclewoods, Maples, Ashes, Cherries, Forest Anemones in the spring, Periwinkles, Lilies of the Valley in May, European Columbines and Solomon's Seals in June.

The forest ends and is replaced by calcerous fields whose fauna is rich and varied (grasses, leguminous plants and orchards), principally serving as bovine grazing areas.

Mirabelle, Plum, Cherry, and Apple Orchards, as well as some small vineyards cover the village's hill.

Many natural springs occur there, one of which is the Saint-Mathieu source.

== History ==
A few ancient forged tools have been discovered in the area, proving the existence of a prehistoric culture in the area. Nevertheless, the village verifiably existed during the period of the Roman Empire, bearing the name of Clareium AD Rupem. The Roman road traveling from Lyon to Trier passed close by.

This village, where the king was the High Magistrate, and which also claimed three other Lords, is mentioned in a property certificate of title on 13 May 1588. Recognizing the right of the bourgeoisie as granted to them by the count, the inhabitants of Clérey - at that time called Clairey-la-Côte- tithed to Jean the Count of Salm and to his successive Lords of Ruppes, an annual rent of one hopper of oats per farm.

In spite of its small population, the village Clairey-la-Côte, had two castles whose ramparts are still visible from Rue du Bois and from above the church. Two lords, M. de Cholet de Saint-Martin et le Baron de Saint-Amand., still reigned from there on the day before the onset of the French Revolution.

Thanks to its unique location, the village was spared during the Thirty Years' War while the neighboring villages suffered greatly - Moncourt, the next village, was totally destroyed.

During a cholera epidemic, the town's many victims were buried in a mass grave in the forest, which remains visible today.

The production of the fine wine, Clairet, was formerly the principal activity of the village. In 1889, thanks to its fully exposed southern slopes, the village produced 500 hl from 25 hectares of vineyard. Today a street bears the name of a wine grower, Tysopin.

But at the beginning of the twentieth century, the vineyards were abandoned following the phylloxera infestation and the competition of cheaper wines from the south. The existence of abandoned wine cellars in some older houses testifies to the village's viticultural past.

The Germans arrived between June 19 and 20, 1940 from the Meuse river by way of Sauvigny. To note: a woman gave birth that day with the help of a German doctor. Throughout the duration of the war, German soldiers were scarcely present in the village.

Today there resides a well-known distiller, George Fresnais, who is also the village's ex-mayor.

The heavy winds from the storm of 1999 caused much damage to the communal forest. The mayor, Jean-Louis Schmit (RIP 2003), invited Swedish lumberjacks to clear the debris and was decorated in the agricultural order of merit.

Dates of Importance:

- 1763: Construction of Saint Matthew's church
- 1869: The inhabitants contributed to build a belfry and purchase bells
- 1821: Construction of the wash house
- 1851: Construction of the town hall & school

== Administration ==
List of successive mayors
Term	Name
2003–present	Daniel Fresnais
Until 2003	Jean-Louis Schmit

== Population ==
Its inhabitants are called Clercycurtiens in French.

Historical population

Year	Pop.	±% p.a.
1793	189	—
1821	214	+0.44%
1846	188	−0.52%
1876	132	−1.17%
1901	119	−0.41%
1926	77	−1.73%
1946	68	−0.62%
1962	71	+0.27%
1968	72	+0.23%

Year	Pop.	±% p.a.
1975	68	−0.81%
1982	66	−0.43%
1990	56	−2.03%
1999	45	−2.40%
2007	38	−2.09%
2012	33	−2.78%
2017	32	−0.61%
2023	25	−4.03%

Source: EHESS and INSEE (1968-2023)

== Moncourt ==
Close to the village is the old locality of Moncourt which was completely destroyed during the Thirty Years' War. The chapel, dating from the thirteenth century, is all that remains today.

Although located in the Meuse department and in the commune of Sauvigny, the chapel was bought by the inhabitants of Clérey-la-Côte as a national treasure. This place of worship was the residence to many monks.

The chapel was dedicated to Saint Gibrien. It was the site of pilgrimages for which Saint Gibrien was called upon by those who have lost a limb or those who have turned away from religion.

The natural spring which runs there is at the center of many beliefs, among them acting as cure against intestinal diseases. It is said that if one poses a piece of clothing horizontally on the fountain, and it falls to the bottom, the cure is assured.

Numerous Merovingian tombs may be located in the vicinity, but no excavation has been carried out to date.

== Gallery ==
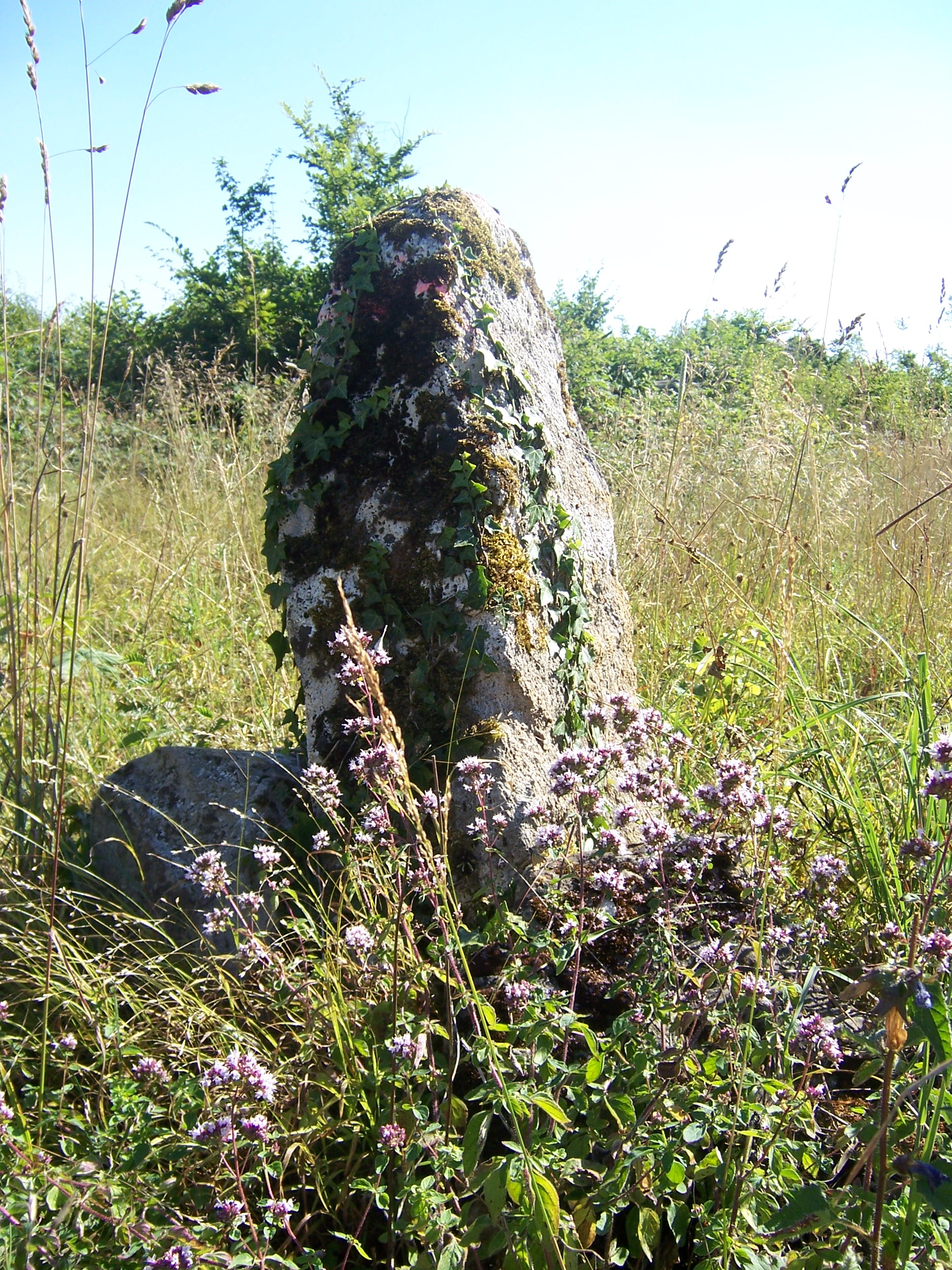
"Site des 3 bornes"

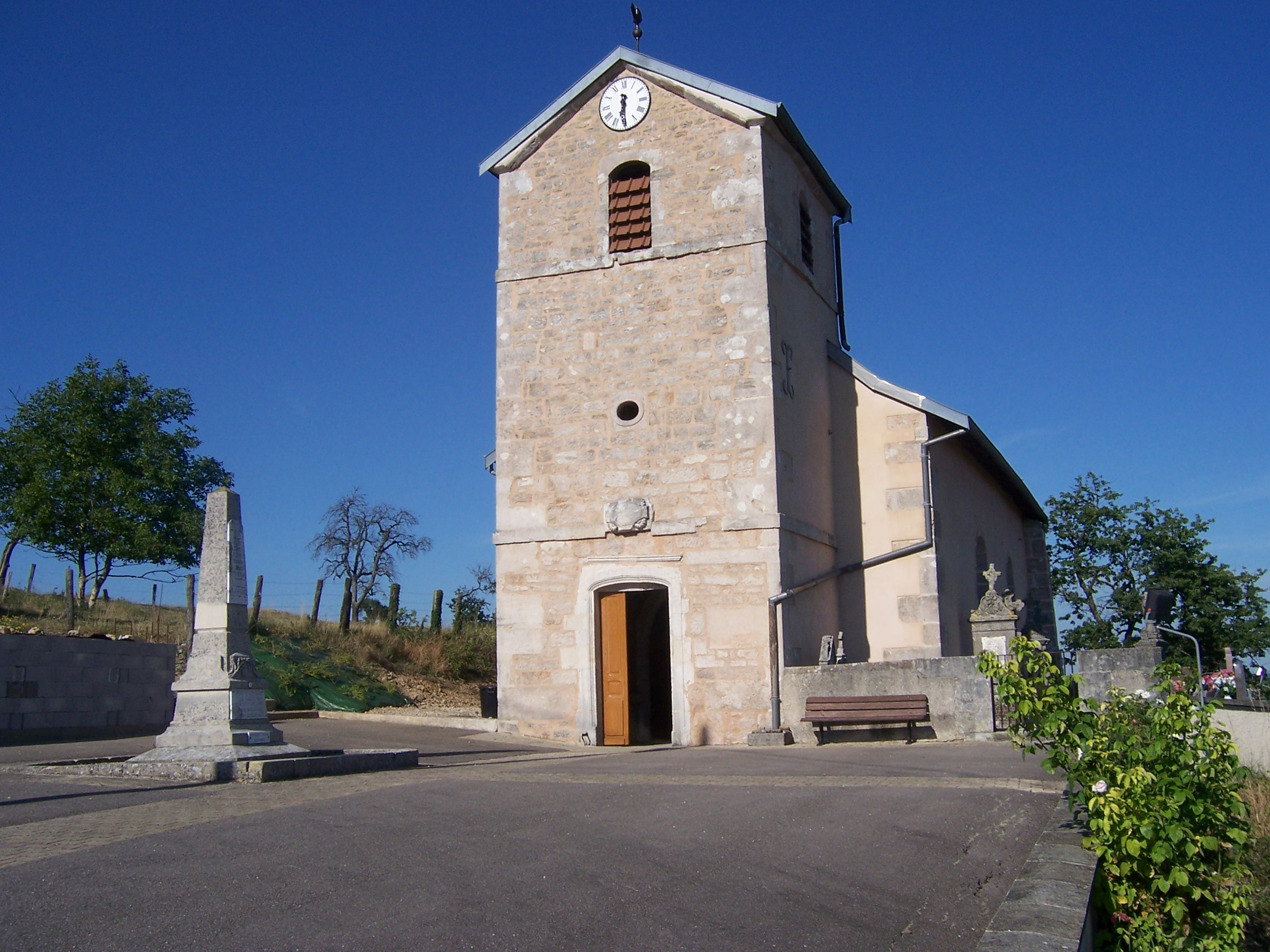
The Church

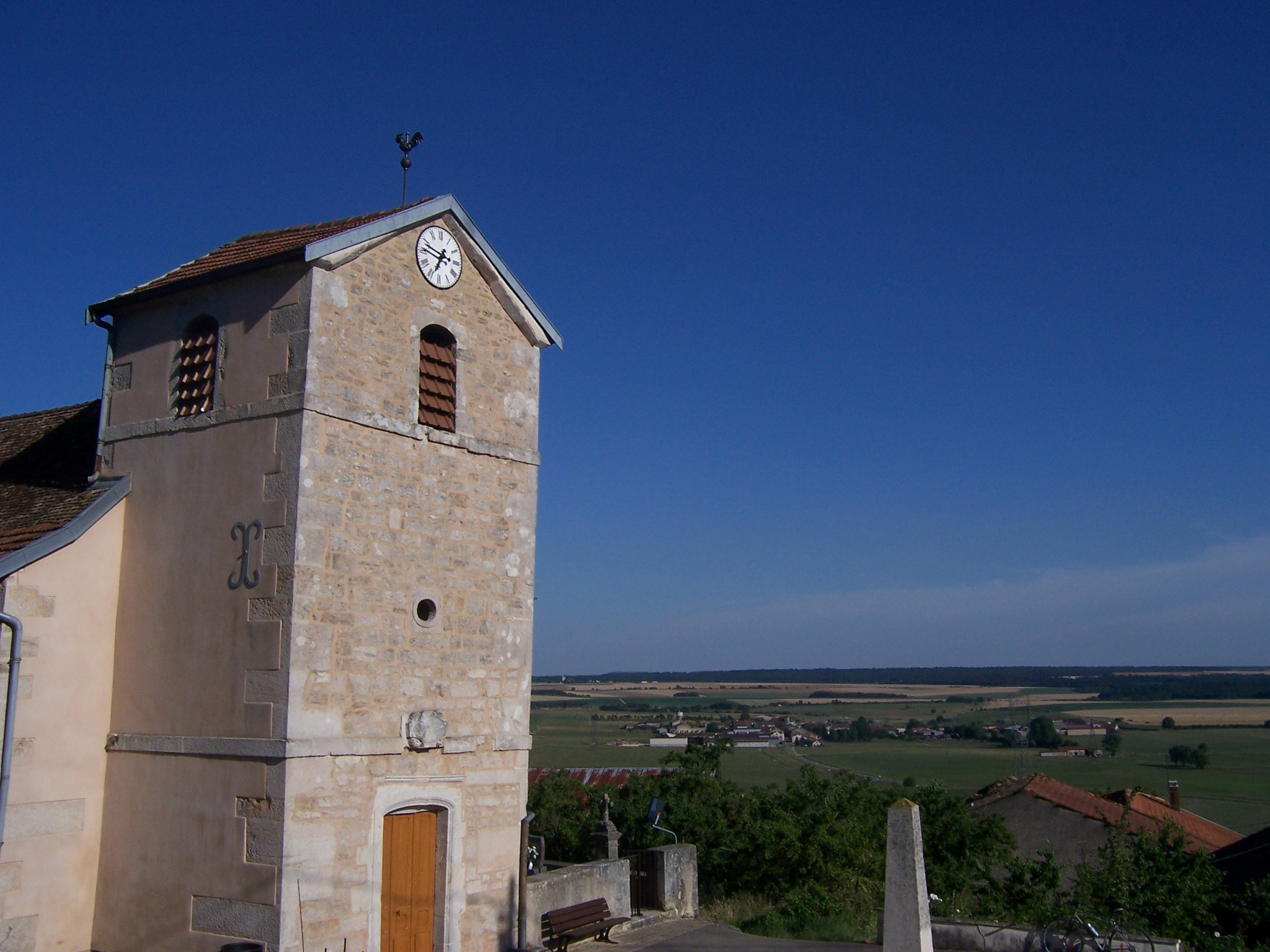
Church Plaza

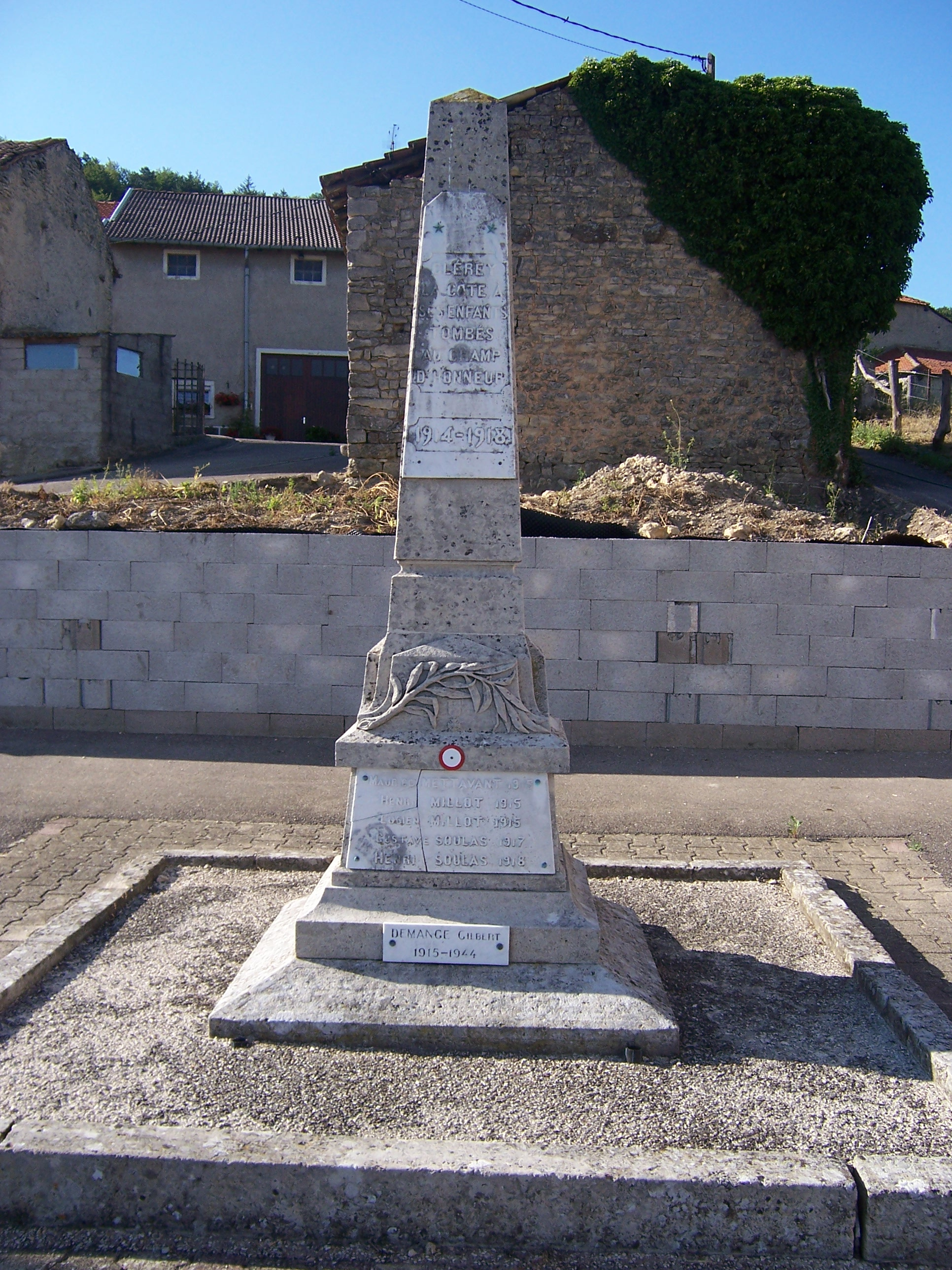
War Memorial

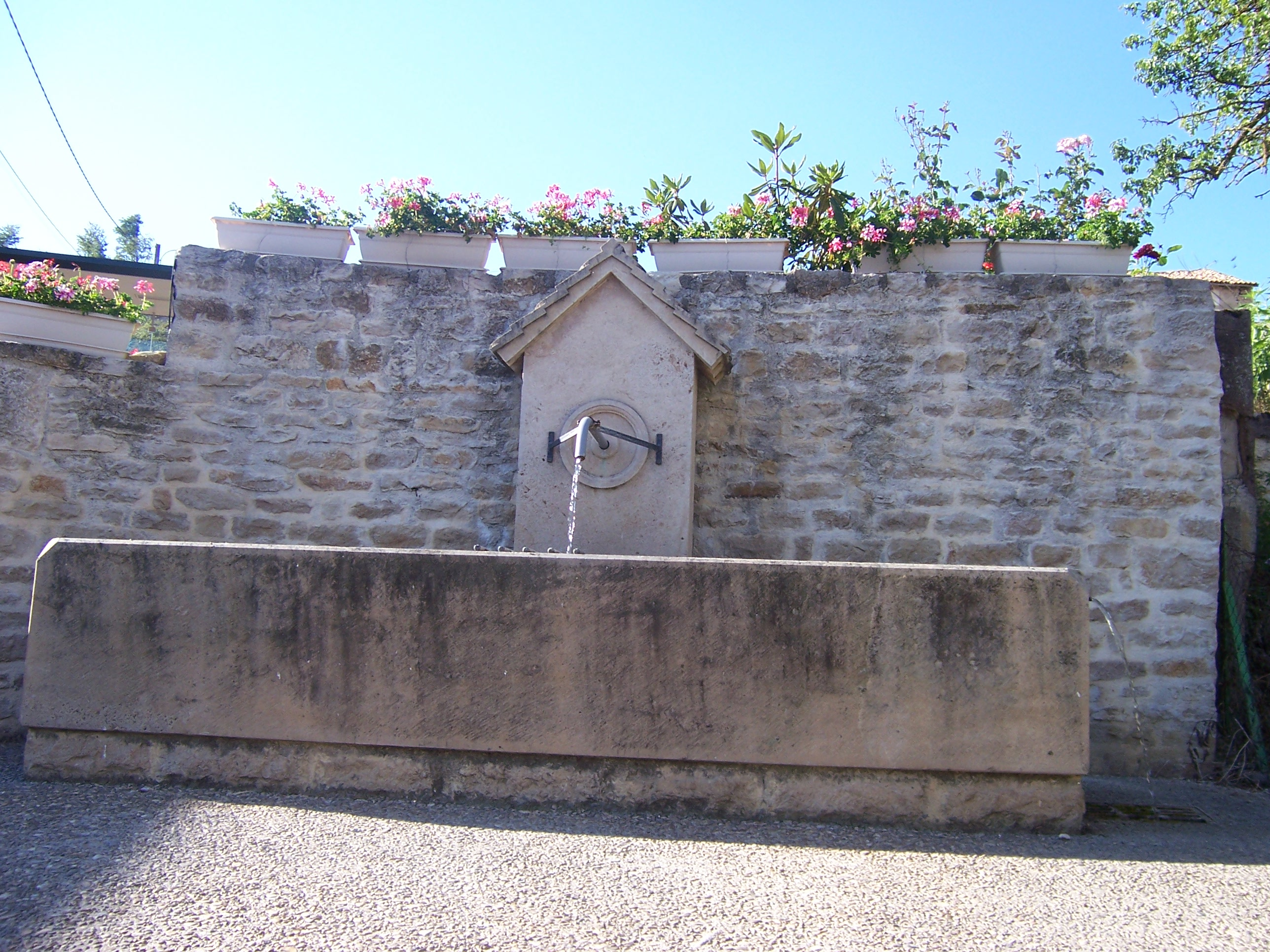
The Town Fountain

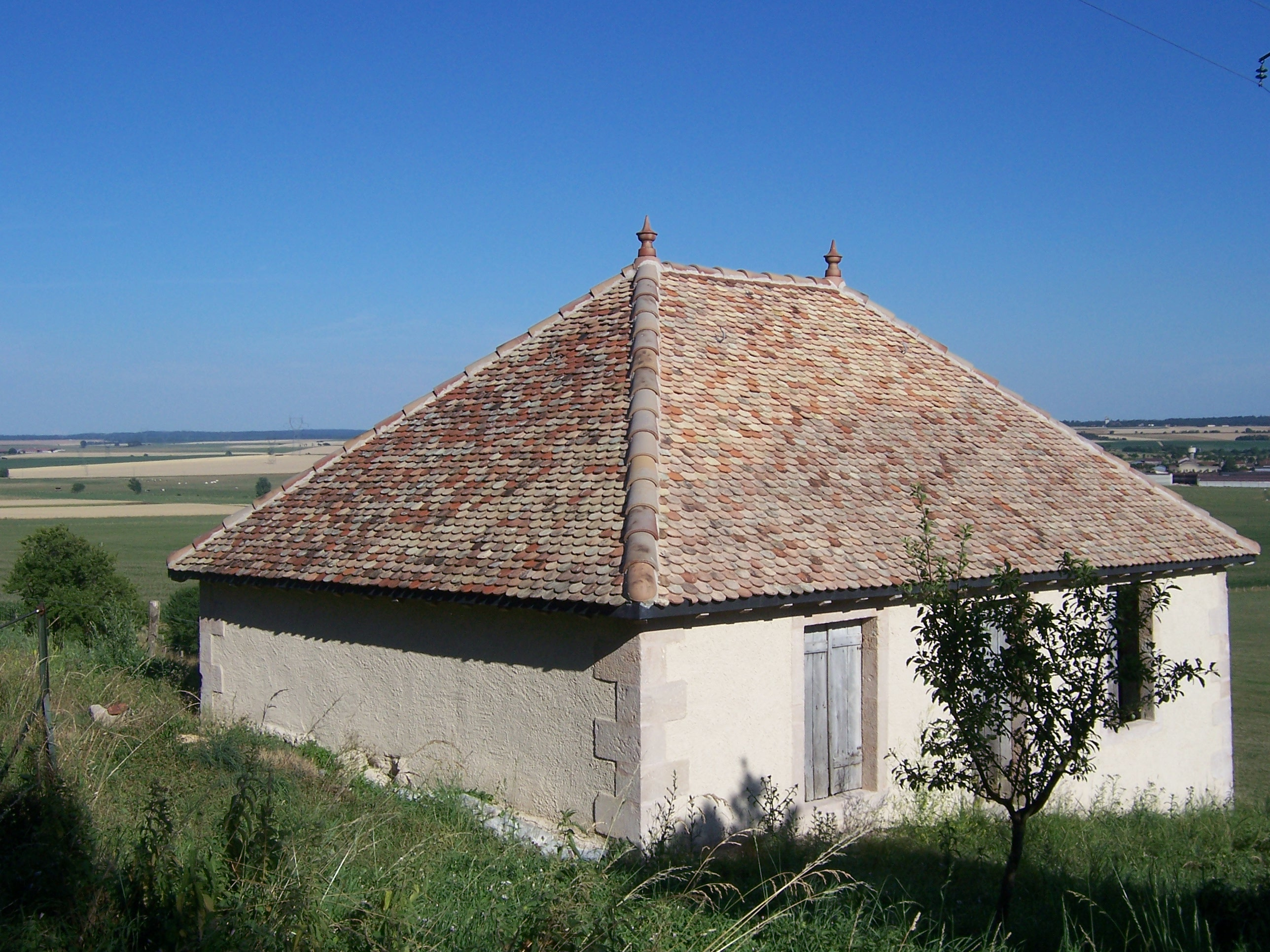
The Wash House

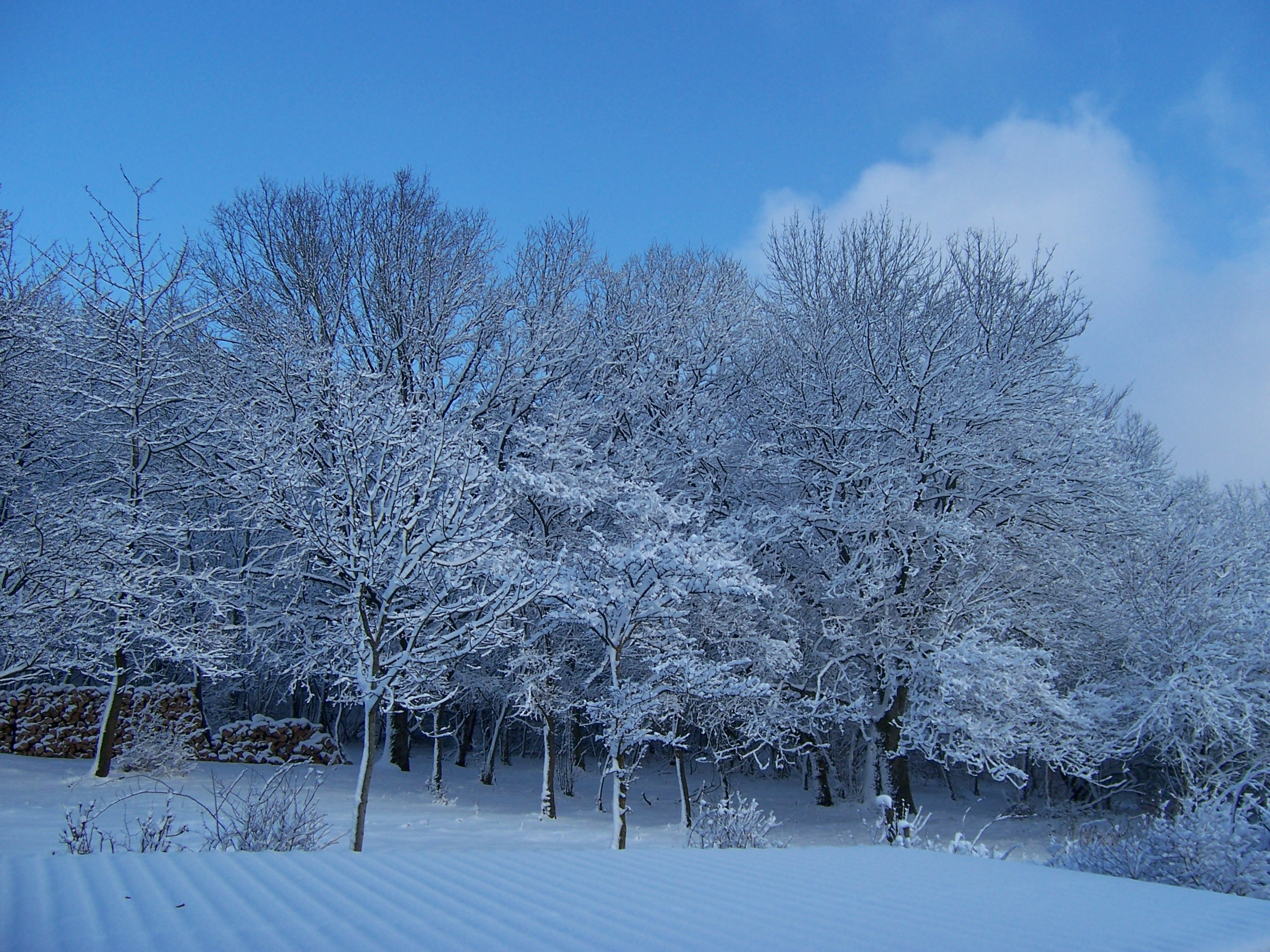
Forrest from Clérey in winter

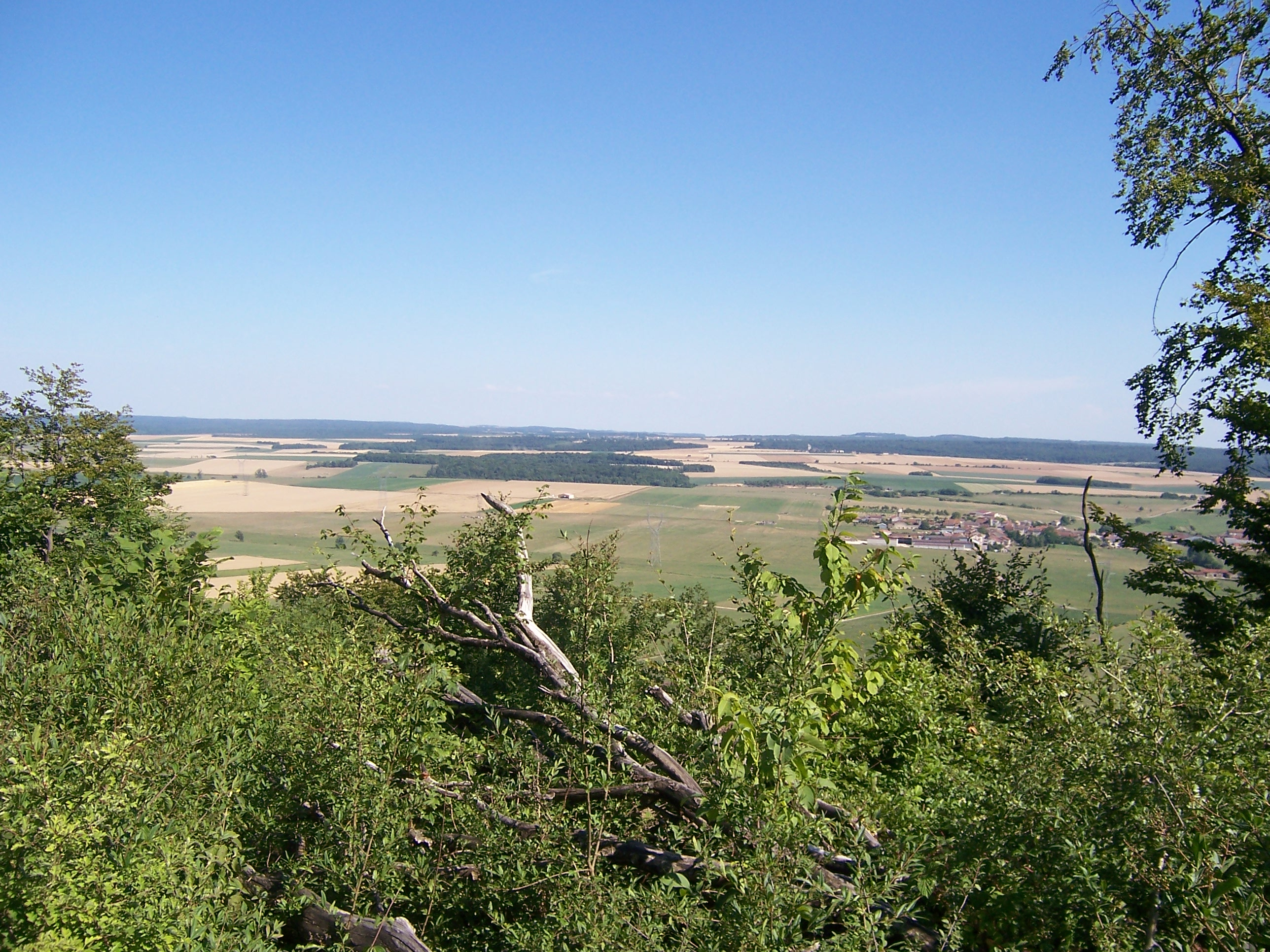
View from the top of Clérey

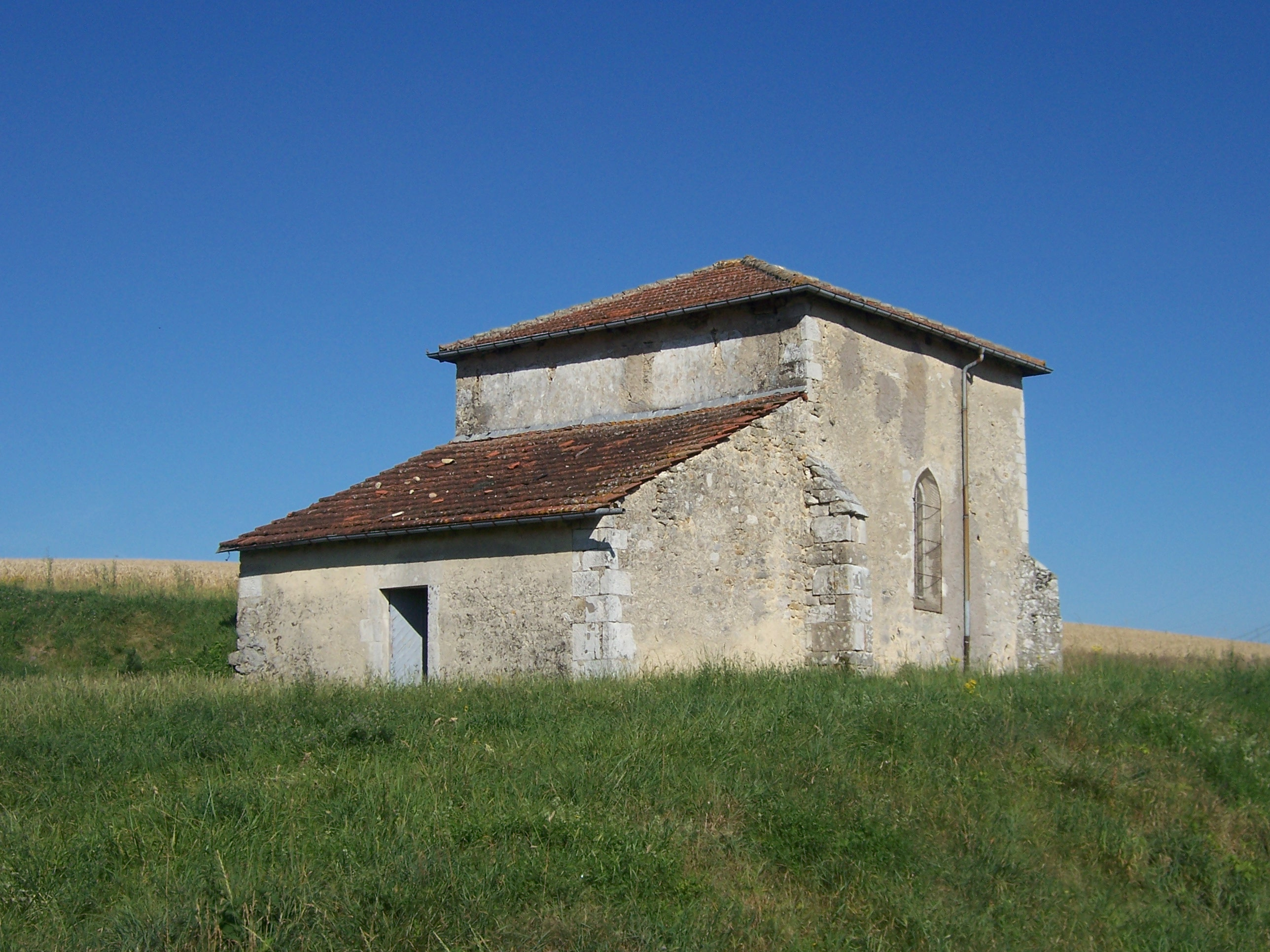
The chapel of Moncourt

== See also ==
- Communes of the Vosges department
