= Convallatoxin =

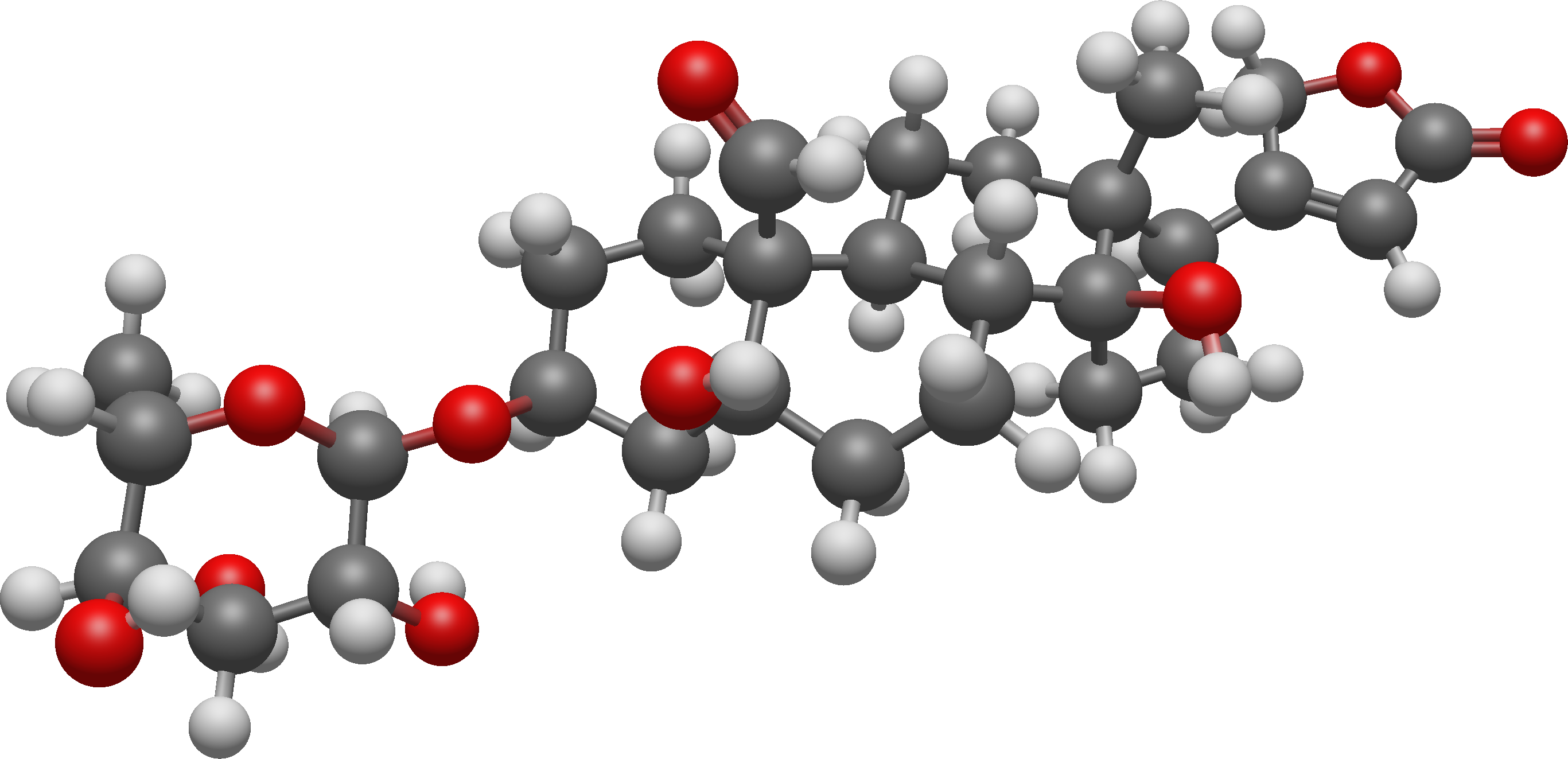

Names
- IUPAC name 5,14-Dihydroxy-19-oxo-3β-(α-L-rhamnopyranosyloxy)-5β-card-20(22)-enolide
- Systematic IUPAC name (1R,3aS,3bR,5aS,7S,9aS,9bS,11aR)-3a,5a-Dihydroxy-11a-methyl-1-(5-oxo-2,5-dihydrofuran-3-yl)-7-{[(2R,3R,4R,5R,6S)-3,4,5-trihydroxy-6-methyloxan-2-yl]oxy}hexadecahydro-9aH-cyclopenta[a]phenanthrene-9a-carbaldehyde
- Other names Strophanthin 3alpha-1-rhamnoside; Strophanthidin alpha-l-rhamnopyranoside; Strophanthidin a-l-rhamnopyranoside; Corglycon (Russian: Коргликон); 20(22),5beta-cardenolid-19-al-3beta,5beta,14beta-triol-3beta-d-[a-1-rhamnopyranoside]; 5Beta,20[22]-cardenolide-19-one-3beta,5alpha,14-triol-3-[6-deoxy-alpha-l-mannopyranosyl]; 3Beta,5alpha,14-trihydroxy-19-oxo-5beta,20[22]-cardenolide-3-[6-deoxy-alpha-l-mannopyranosyl]

Identifiers
CAS Number	508-75-8
3D model (JSmol)	Interactive image
ChEBI	CHEBI:27663
ChEMBL	ChEMBL399336
ChemSpider	390428
ECHA InfoCard	100.007.352
EC Number	208-086-3
KEGG	C08858
PubChem CID	441852
UNII	JY264VIR1Y
CompTox Dashboard (EPA)	DTXSID90862073
- InChI: InChI=1S/C29H42O10/c1-15-22(32)23(33)24(34)25(38-15)39-17-3-8-27(14-30)19-4-7-26(2)18(16-11-21(31)37-13-16)6-10-29(26,36)20(19)5-9-28(27,35)12-17/h11,14-15,17-20,22-25,32-36H,3-10,12-13H2,1-2H3/t15-,17-,18+,19-,20+,22-,23+,24+,25-,26+,27-,28-,29-/m0/s1 Key: HULMNSIAKWANQO-JQKSAQOKSA-N; InChI=1/C29H42O10/c1-15-22(32)23(33)24(34)25(38-15)39-17-3-8-27(14-30)19-4-7-26(2)18(16-11-21(31)37-13-16)6-10-29(26,36)20(19)5-9-28(27,35)12-17/h11,14-15,17-20,22-25,32-36H,3-10,12-13H2,1-2H3/t15-,17-,18+,19-,20+,22-,23+,24+,25-,26+,27-,28-,29-/m0/s1 Key: HULMNSIAKWANQO-JQKSAQOKBT
- SMILES: O=C\1OC/C(=C/1)[C@H]2CC[C@@]6(O)[C@]2(C)CC[C@H]4[C@H]6CC[C@]5(O)C[C@@H](O[C@@H]3O[C@H]([C@H](O)[C@@H](O)[C@H]3O)C)CC[C@]45C=O

Properties
Chemical formula	C_{29}H_{42}O_{10}
Molar mass	550.645 g·mol^{−1}
- Except where otherwise noted, data are given for materials in their standard state (at 25 °C [77 °F], 100 kPa). verify (what is ?) Infobox references

Convallatoxin is a glycoside extracted from Convallaria majalis.

== History ==
Convallatoxin is a natural cardiac glycoside that can be found, among others, in the plant lily of the valley (Convallaria majalis). Legend says that Apollo gave this plant to Asclepios, the Greek god of healing. Lily of the valley has indeed been used medicinally to treat illness, all going back to medieval times. Convallatoxin has a similar therapeutic target and effect as digitalis, so it was used by medieval herbalists as a substitute for foxglove in treatment. It is mostly administered because it strengthens the heartbeat, while also slowing and regulating the heart rate. In 2011, the lily of the valley was used in the US television show Breaking Bad. This made the plant, and its compound convallatoxin, quite well known by the general public as fatal.

== Structure and reactivity ==
The systematic name of the organic compound convallatoxin is as follows: (1R,3aS,3bR,5aS,7S,9aS,9bS,11aR)-3a,5a-dihydroxy-11a-methyl-1-(5-oxo-2,5-dihydrofuran-3-yl)-7-{[(2R,3R,4R,5R,6S)-3,4,5-trihydroxy-6-methyloxan-2-yl]oxy}hexadecahydro-9aH-cyclopenta[a]phenanthrene-9a-carbaldehyde. A shorter semisystematic IUPAC name is 5,14-dihydroxy-19-oxo-3β-(α-L-rhamnopyranosyloxy)-5β-card-20(22)-enolide. The structure of convallatoxin consists of strophanthidin and has a 6-deoxy-α-L-mannopyranosyl group attached at position 3.

Convallatoxin can donate a hydrogen bond at five places and it can accept a hydrogen bond on ten accounts. Its melting point lies between 235 and 242 degrees Celsius and the compound is soluble in alcohol, acetone and slightly in chloroform, ethyl acetate and water.

Since convallatoxin is structurally similar to digoxin, research has been done to determine if convallatoxin in serum can be detected with LOCI digoxin assays. This showed that the compound has significant cross-reactivity with the used antibody and that it causes bidirectional interference in the digoxin assay. So, convallatoxin can indeed be detected with a LOCI digoxin assay. It may also be possible that convallatoxin cross-reacts with the antidigoxin antibody used in other commercially available digoxin assays, but this should be investigated further. Furthermore, the antigen Digibind does also bind convallatoxin in vitro. This could possibly be used in treatment of convallatoxin poisoning.

== Synthesis ==
Even though convallatoxin can be found in nature, it is also synthesized by manufacturers. This can be done via the Koenigs-Knorr method, in which strophanthidin is glycosylated with 2,3,4-tri-O-acetyl-α-L-rhamnopyranosyl bromide. These two compounds are the precursors of convallatoxin. After alkaline hydrolysis, extraction from strophanthidin residues and crystallization of isopropanol, the reaction product is liberated. This reaction product is convallatoxin. When using 10 grams of strophanthidin, 13.6 grams of convallatoxin can be produced.

== Mechanism of action and efficacy ==
Convallatoxin is a digitalis like compound (DLC), which is mainly used as a cardiac glycoside since it can inhibit the Na^{+},K^{+}-ATPase in congestive heart failure or arrhythmias, which causes an inotropic effect, same as many other digitalis like compounds. The Na^{+},K^{+}-ATPase creates the ion gradient between the intra- and extracellular domains of a cell. It does this by transporting three sodium ions out of and two potassium ions into the cell. If the Na^{+},K^{+}-ATPase is inhibited, sodium will accumulate in the cell, preventing the sodium-calcium exchanger to work during diastole. If calcium accumulates in cardiac myocytes, the uptake of calcium into the sarcoplasmic reticulum (SR) is increased. Thus, when stimulation of the cardiac muscle occurs, the SR releases higher levels of calcium, which increases the contractility of the myocytes. The increased release of calcium also increases the refractory period of the atrioventricular (AV) node, regulating the heart beat cycle in patients with arrhythmia.

In lung, colon and breast cancer cells, convallatoxin shows great effects at nano doses. It has been shown to inhibit cell proliferation, invasion and migration of cancer cells. The underlying mechanisms of this are not fully known. However, it has been demonstrated that convallatoxin induces apoptosis and autophagy at a dose of 10 nM per 3 days. It was also shown to inhibit angiogenesis through autophagy and apoptosis at concentrations of 2–4 nM. Autophagy is induced in human cervical carcinoma cells, or HeLa cells by convallatoxin blocking the mTOR signalling pathway. This signalling pathway usually inhibits autophagy in cells. Convallatoxin induces apoptosis by increasing caspase-3 and PARP cleavage. These proteins induce programmed cell death when activated by cleavage. It is not entirely clear if the induction of apoptosis and autophagy is related to the inhibitory effects of convallatoxin on the Na^{+}, K^{+}-ATPase pump. However, a dose of 10 nM convallatoxin can reduce A549 non small cell lung cancer cells by inhibiting the Na^{+},K^{+}-ATPase. Numbers differ per experiment. In colon cancer a LD50 of 50 nM is shown. In MCF-7 derived breast cancer cells an IC50 dose of 10 nM over a long time (exposure 24 h) show 27.65 ± 8.5 or over an even longer time (exposure 72 h), 5.32 ± 0.15 are observed.

There are many more potential therapeutic uses for convallatoxin, for example against cystic fibrosis and neurodegenerative diseases. It has also been demonstrated to inhibit viral infection and replication. For example, convallatoxin can be used as a treatment for the Human Cytomegalovirus. It will inhibit the Na^{+}-K^{+}-ATPase pump which decreases the sodium concentration outside the cell, and thus limiting cotransport of methionine and sodium into the cell, disabling protein synthesis. A dose of 0.01 μM already has a great efficacy against the cytomegalovirus, but at a dose of 50 nM or less a great potency is also shown that can last up to 4 hours.

Convallatoxin is thus quite an efficient drug, showing effects with small doses in treatment of multiple diseases. It is excreted by P-glycoprotein and an affinity of 1.07 ± 0.24 mM and a V_{max} of 5.2 ± 0.4 mmol mg/protein/min were determined. Excretion of convallatoxin is mainly by the kidneys (a clogP of about -0.7).

== Metabolism ==
Convallatoxin is mainly metabolised in the liver by the conversion of convallatoxin into convallatoxol. For this, the aldehyde (-CHO) group attached to C¬10 is reduced to an alcohol group (-CH_{2}OH) by cytochrome P450 reductase (CYP450). This is a phase I metabolism reaction. However, further modification through a phase II reaction of convallatoxin has not been found. The reduction of convallatoxin increases its polarity, thus enabling the compound to be excreted more readily. This form of convallatoxin metabolism can be found in rats, however is not present in guinea pigs and only traces of convallatoxol can be found in cats.

Convallatoxin has a very small therapeutic index (40–50 nM) i.e. the margin is narrow between a therapeutic dose and an overdose giving rise to symptoms of poisoning. Even so, the cytotoxicity of convallatoxin is mainly time-dependent.

At an increased plasma level, DLCs (including convallatoxin) toxicity symptoms include dizziness, fatigue, nausea, loss of appetite, vision disturbance, vomiting, hypertension, arrhythmia, cardiac arrest, coma, abdominal pain and convulsions, heart failure or death.

== Effects on animals ==
On certain animals, convallatoxin has quite interesting effects. The lifespan of C. elegans, a nematode, can be expanded by convallatoxin. About 20 μM of convallatoxin shows no toxicity and can expand the lifespan of the worm by 16.3% due to certain mechanisms, including improvement of pharyngeal pumping, locomotion, reduced lipofuscin accumulation and ROS.

Where the convallatoxin has quite positive effects on nematodes, it is extra poisonous to cats. It causes nephrotoxicity and acute renal failure, but at what dose exactly is not known. Symptoms are salivation, vomiting, anorexia and depression. It can be treated with dialysis, when diuresis is started before the acute renal failure.
