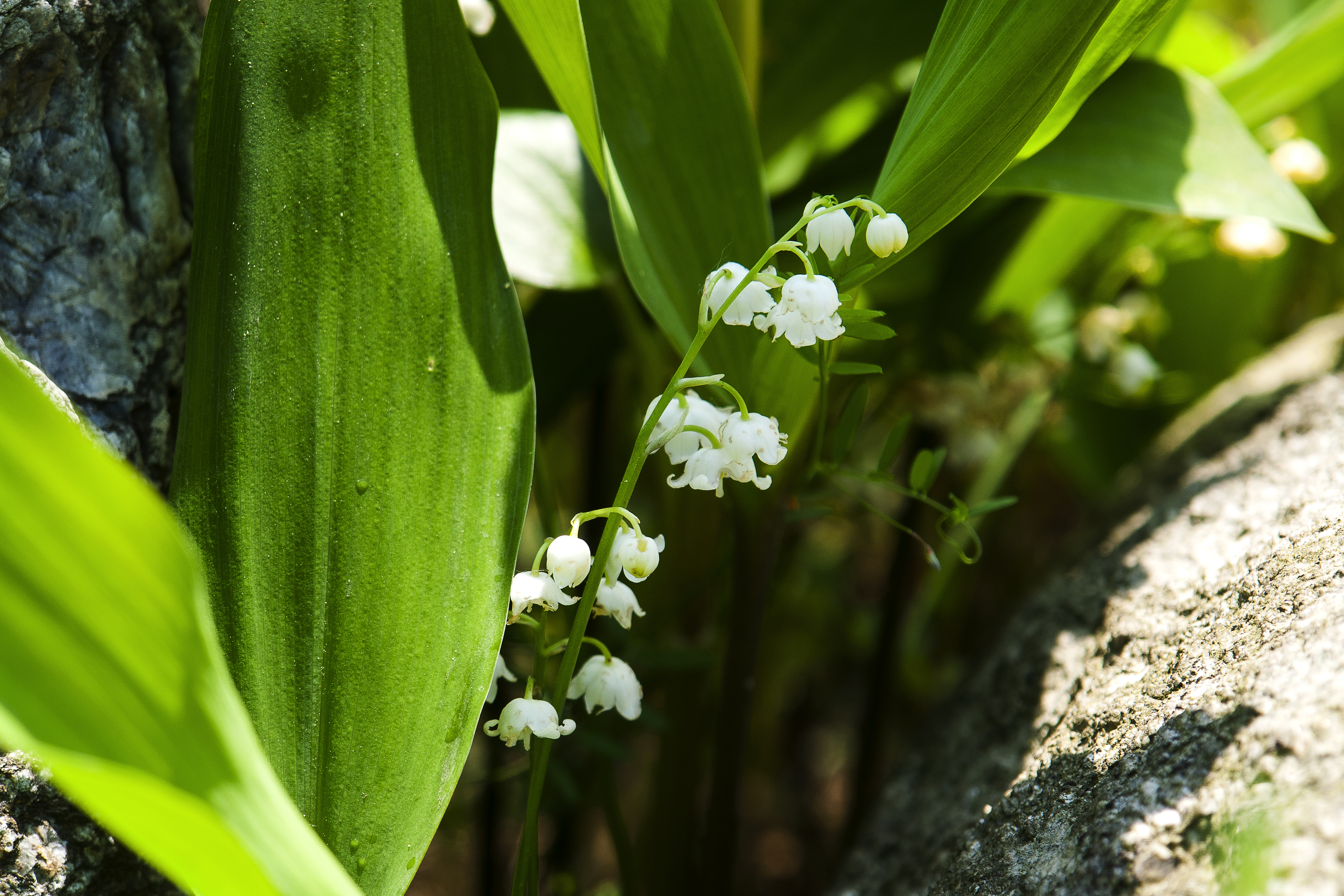
- Convallaria keiskei

Scientific classification
- Kingdom: Plantae
- Clade: Tracheophytes
- Clade: Angiosperms
- Clade: Monocots
- Order: Asparagales
- Family: Asparagaceae
- Subfamily: Convallarioideae
- Genus: Convallaria; L.
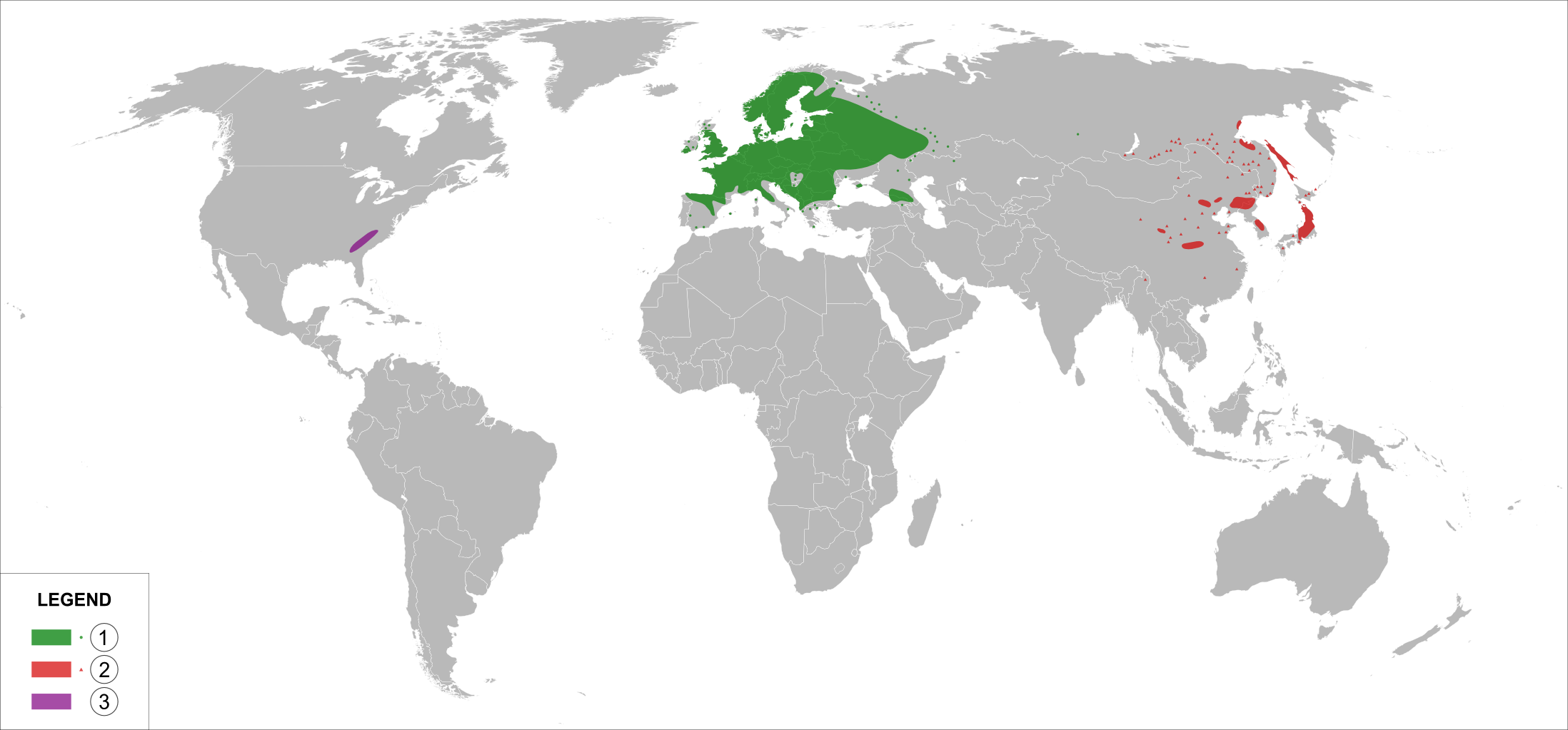
- Map of Convallaria species distribution: Green — Convallaria majalis or lily of the valley Red — Convallaria keiskei Violet — Convallaria pseudomajalis

Synonyms
- Lilium-convallium Tourn. ex Moench

= Convallaria =

Genus of flowering plants

Convallaria is a genus of flowering plants, commonly known as lily-of-the-valley. It includes three species native to temperate Eurasia and the east-central United States.

Image	Name	Distribution
	Convallaria keiskei Miq.	southeastern Siberia, Japan, Korea, northern, central, and southeastern China, Mongolia, and Myanmar
	Convallaria majalis L. – lily-of-the-valley	Europe, Turkey, Caucasus, Kazakhstan, and central Siberia
	Convallaria pseudomajalis W.Bartram – American lily-of-the-valley;	east-central United States (southern Appalachians from West Virginia to Georgia)

The generic name means valley in Botanical Latin, in reference to the plant's natural geographical habitat.
