= Convallamarin =

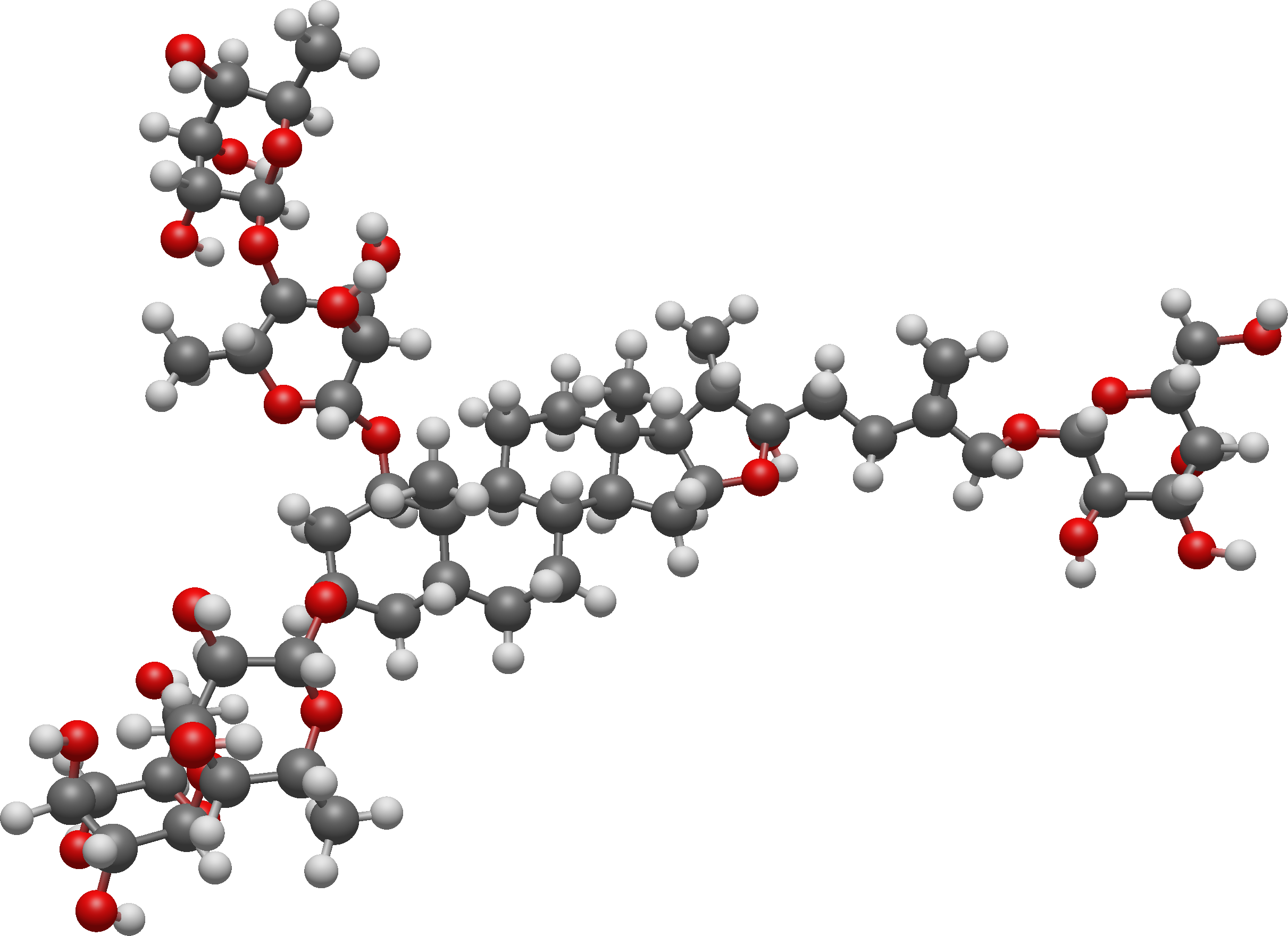

Names
- IUPAC name (22R)-27-(β-D-Galactopyranosyloxy)-3β-[β-D-glucopyranosyl-(1→4)-6-deoxy-β-D-gulopyranosyloxy]-22-hydroxy-5β-furost-25-en-1β-yl 6-deoxy-β-D-gulopyranosyl-(1→4)-6-deoxy-β-D-allopyranoside
- Systematic IUPAC name (1^{2}S,1^{3}R,1^{4}S,1^{5}S,1^{6}R,3^{2}R,3^{3}R,3^{4}S,3^{5}R,3^{6}R,5^{2}R,5^{4}R,5^{4a}S,5^{4b}S,5^{6a}S,5^{6b}R,5^{7}S,5^{8}R,5^{9a}S,5^{10a}S,5^{10b}S,5^{12a}R,7^{2}R,7^{3}R,7^{4}S,7^{5}S,7^{6}R,9^{2}S,9^{3}R,9^{4}R,9^{5}R,9^{6}R)-1^{6}-(Hydroxymethyl)-3^{6},5^{4a},5^{6a},5^{7},7^{6},9^{6}-hexamethyl-5^{8}-(3-methylidene-4-{[(2R,3R,4S,5R,6R)-3,4,5-trihydroxy-6-(hydroxymethyl)oxan-2-yl]oxy}butyl)octadecahydro-5^{1}H-2,4,6,8-tetraoxa-5(2,4)-naphtho[2′,1′:4,5]indeno[2,1-b]furana-1,9(2),3(5,2),7(2,5)-tetrakis(oxana)nonaphane-1^{3},1^{4},1^{5},3^{3},3^{4},5^{8},7^{3},7^{4},9^{3},9^{4},9^{5}-undecol

Identifiers
CAS Number	1391-12-4
3D model (JSmol)	Interactive image
ChemSpider	4884540
ECHA InfoCard	100.014.298
EC Number	215-728-6
PubChem CID	23304308
- InChI: InChI=1S/C57H94O27/c1-20(19-74-50-43(68)39(64)36(61)31(17-58)79-50)10-13-57(73)21(2)34-30(84-57)16-29-27-9-8-25-14-26(78-51-46(71)41(66)49(23(4)76-51)83-54-45(70)40(65)37(62)32(18-59)80-54)15-33(56(25,7)28(27)11-12-55(29,34)6)81-52-47(72)42(67)48(24(5)77-52)82-53-44(69)38(63)35(60)22(3)75-53/h21-54,58-73H,1,8-19H2,2-7H3/t21-,22+,23+,24+,25+,26+,27+,28-,29-,30-,31+,32+,33+,34-,35-,36-,37+,38+,39-,40-,41-,42-,43+,44+,45+,46+,47+,48+,49-,50+,51-,52-,53-,54-,55-,56-,57+/m0/s1 Key: PSJVJZYSECBFHJ-BANYBNOTSA-N
- SMILES: O[C@@H]%10[C@H](O)[C@@H](O)[C@H](O[C@H]%10O[C@H]1[C@@H](O)[C@@H](O)[C@@H](O[C@@H]1C)O[C@@H]5C[C@H](O[C@@H]3O[C@H](C)[C@H](O[C@@H]2O[C@H](CO)[C@@H](O)[C@H](O)[C@H]2O)[C@@H](O)[C@H]3O)C[C@H]6CC[C@H]4[C@H]9[C@](CC[C@@H]4[C@@]56C)([C@@H]7[C@@H](O[C@@](O)([C@H]7C)CCC(=C)\CO[C@@H]8O[C@H](CO)[C@H](O)[C@H](O)[C@H]8O)C9)C)C

Properties
Chemical formula	C_{57}H_{94}O_{27}
Molar mass	1211.352 g·mol^{−1}
Appearance	Yellowish-white crystalline powder
- Except where otherwise noted, data are given for materials in their standard state (at 25 °C [77 °F], 100 kPa). Infobox references

Convallamarin is a crystalline glycoside extracted from Convallaria majalis.
