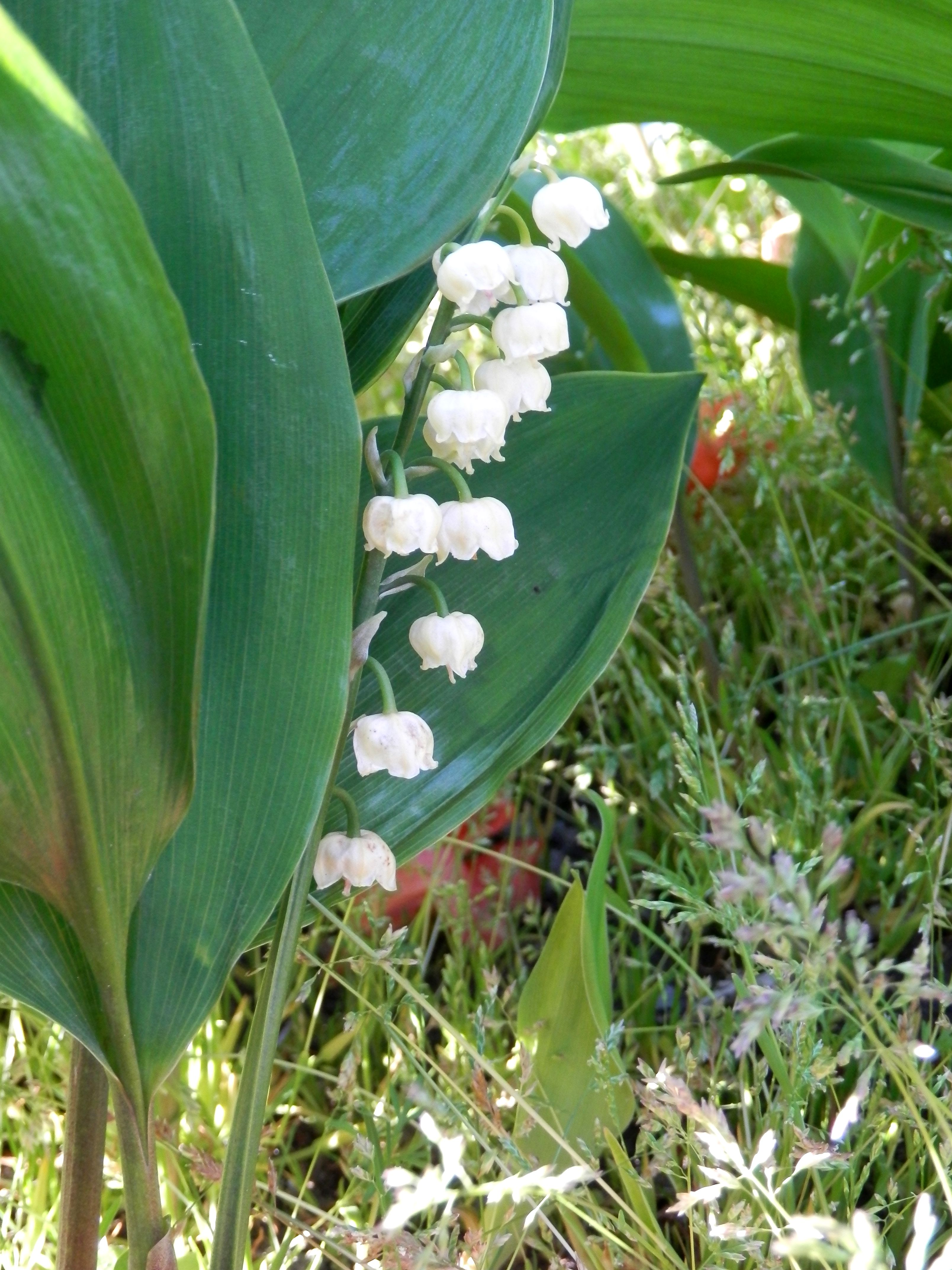
- In Eniwa, Hokkaido
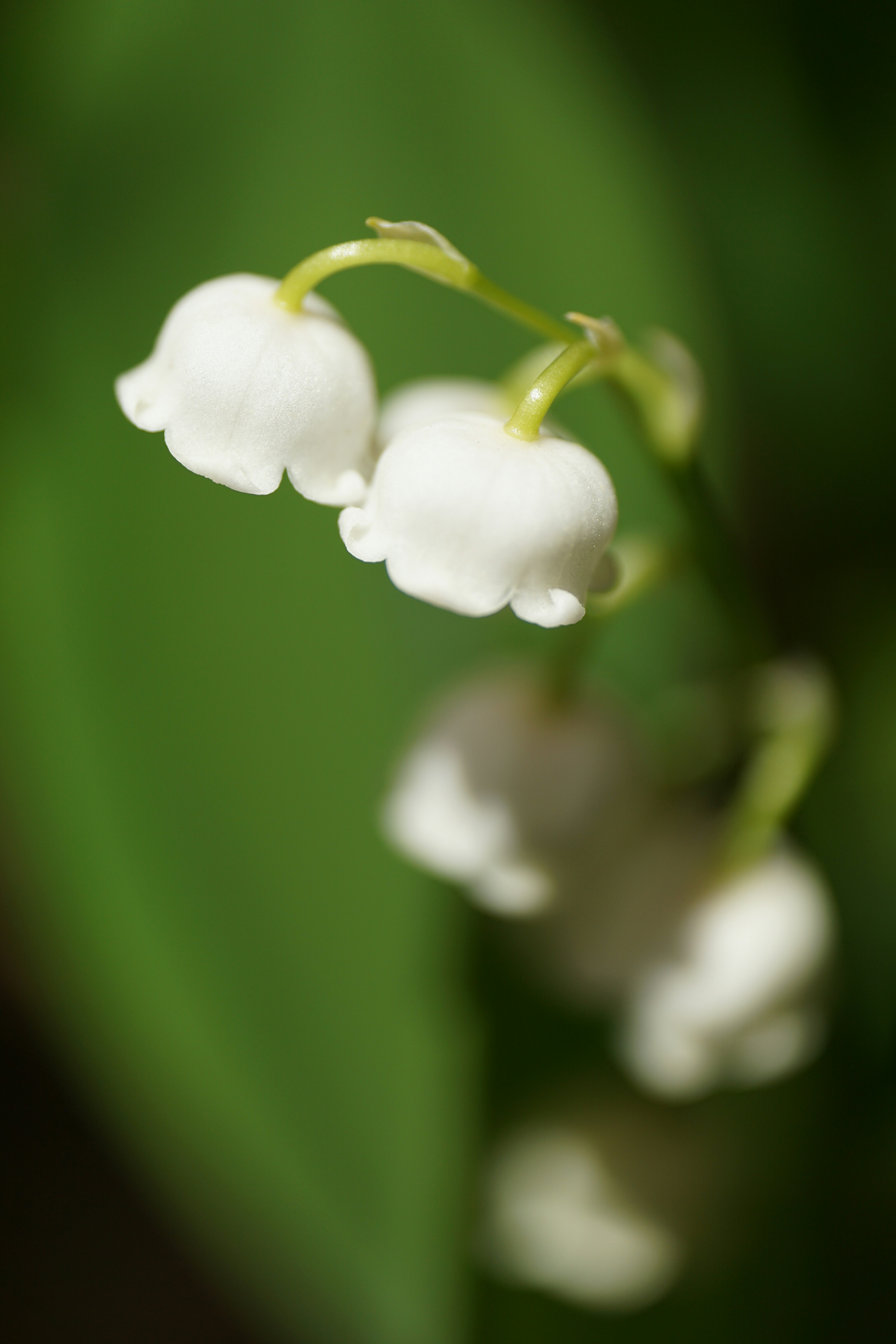
- Close-up of flowers

Scientific classification
- Kingdom: Plantae
- Clade: Embryophytes
- Clade: Tracheophytes
- Clade: Angiosperms
- Clade: Monocots
- Order: Asparagales
- Family: Asparagaceae
- Subfamily: Convallarioideae
- Genus: Convallaria
- Species: C. keiskei

Binomial name
- Convallaria keiskei Miq.

Synonyms
- List: Convallaria japonica Greene; Convallaria keiskei f. colorata Ponert; Convallaria keiskei f. desulavii Ponert; Convallaria keiskei var. trifolia Y.C.Chu & J.F.Li; Convallaria majalis var. keiskei (Miq.) Makino; Convallaria majalis subsp. manschurica (Kom.) Bordz.; Convallaria majalis var. manshurica Kom.; Convallaria manschurica (Kom.) Knorring

= Convallaria keiskei =

Species of plant

Convallaria keiskei, the Asian lily of the valley, is a species of flowering plant in the family Asparagaceae. It is native to southeastern Siberia, southern parts of the Russian Far East, Mongolia, eastern China, Myanmar, Korea, and Japan. A rhizomatous perennial 30 cm (12 in) tall by 50 cm (20 in) wide, it is available from commercial suppliers.
