= OR3A1 =

Protein-coding gene in the species Homo sapiens

Identifiers
- Aliases: OR3A1, OLFRA03, OR17-40, OR17-82, OR40, olfactory receptor family 3 subfamily A member 1, olfactory receptor family 3 subfamily A member 1 (gene/pseudogene)
- External IDs: MGI: 3030236; GeneCards: OR3A1

Gene location (Human)
Chr.	Chromosome 17 (human)
Band	17p13.3	Start	3,291,017 bp
Band	17p13.3	End	3,298,360 bp

Gene location (Mouse)
Chr.	Chromosome 11 (mouse)
Band	11|11 B5	Start	74,044,355 bp
Band	11|11 B5	End	74,048,987 bp
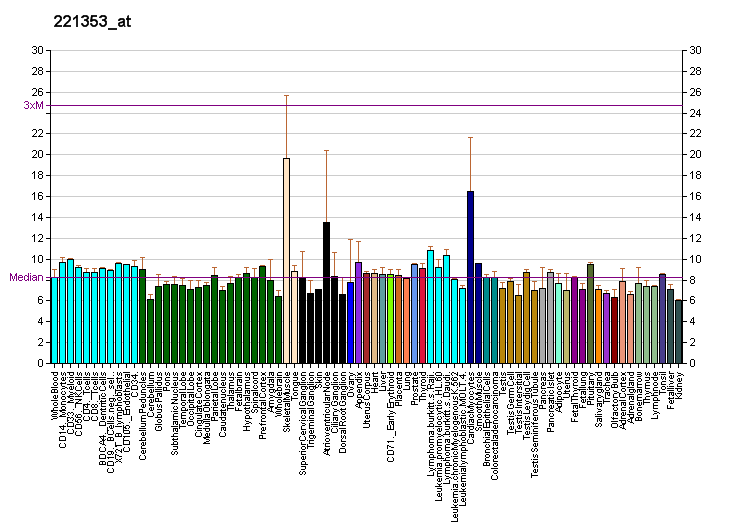
RNA expression pattern
Bgee	Human / Mouse (ortholog); Top expressed in: testicle; secondary oocyte; gonad; islet of Langerhans; ventricular zone; prefrontal cortex; urinary bladder; right testis; left testis; gallbladder / n/a; More reference expression data
BioGPS	More reference expression data
Gene ontology
Molecular function	G protein-coupled receptor activity; signal transducer activity; olfactory receptor activity
Cellular component	integral component of membrane; plasma membrane; membrane
Biological process	sensory perception of smell; signal transduction; response to stimulus; detection of chemical stimulus involved in sensory perception of smell; G protein-coupled receptor signaling pathway
Sources:Amigo / QuickGO
Orthologs
Databases	NCBI: entry; OMA: entry
Species	Human	Mouse
Entrez	4994	258703
Ensembl	ENSG00000180090	ENSMUSG00000070379
UniProt	P47881	Q8VFX8
RefSeq (mRNA)	NM_002550	NM_146708
RefSeq (protein)	NP_002541	NP_666919
Location (UCSC)	Chr 17: 3.29 – 3.3 Mb	Chr 11: 74.04 – 74.05 Mb
PubMed search
- Wikidata
View/Edit Human	View/Edit Mouse

Olfactory receptor 3A1 is a protein that in humans is encoded by the OR3A1 gene.

Olfactory receptors interact with odorant molecules in the nose, to initiate a neuronal response that triggers the perception of a smell. The olfactory receptor proteins are members of a large family of G-protein-coupled receptors (GPCR) arising from single coding-exon genes. Olfactory receptors share a 7-transmembrane domain structure with many neurotransmitter and hormone receptors and are responsible for the recognition and G protein-mediated transduction of odorant signals. The olfactory receptor gene family is the largest in the genome. The nomenclature assigned to the olfactory receptor genes and proteins for this organism is independent of other organisms.

== Ligands ==
OR3A1 is activated by helional and the closely related molecule heliotropylacetone. Other compounds including piperonal, safrole, and vanillin completely failed to activate OR3A1.

Agonists:

- helional
- heliotropylacetone
- lilial
- cyclamen aldehyde
- foliaver (3-(4-methoxyphenyl)-2-methylpropanal)

== See also ==
- Olfactory receptor
