= C13H18O =

The molecular formula C_{13}H_{18}O (molar mass: 190.28 g/mol, exact mass: 190.1358 u) may refer to:

- Bourgeonal
- Cyclamen aldehyde
- Damascenone
