= OR1D2 =

Protein-coding gene in the species Homo sapiens

Identifiers
- Aliases: OR1D2, OLFR1, OR17-4, olfactory receptor family 1 subfamily D member 2
- External IDs: OMIM: 164342; MGI: 3030246; GeneCards: OR1D2

Gene location (Mouse)
Chr.	Chromosome 11 (mouse)
Band	11|11 B5	Start	74,252,895 bp
Band	11|11 B5	End	74,257,044 bp
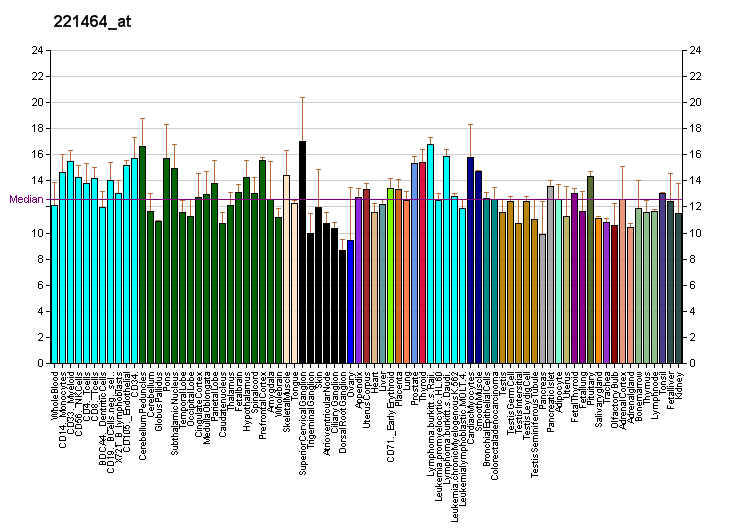
RNA expression pattern
Bgee	Human / Mouse (ortholog); Top expressed in: pancreatic ductal cell; tibialis anterior muscle; lower lobe of lung / n/a; More reference expression data
BioGPS	More reference expression data
Gene ontology
Molecular function	G protein-coupled receptor activity; olfactory receptor activity; signal transducer activity; identical protein binding
Cellular component	integral component of membrane; plasma membrane; integral component of plasma membrane; membrane
Biological process	chemotaxis; sensory perception of smell; signal transduction; single fertilization; response to stimulus; detection of chemical stimulus involved in sensory perception of smell; G protein-coupled receptor signaling pathway
Sources:Amigo / QuickGO
Orthologs
Databases	NCBI: entry; OMA: entry
Species	Human	Mouse
Entrez	4991	258153
Ensembl	ENSG00000184166	ENSMUSG00000058275
UniProt	P34982	Q7TRW7
RefSeq (mRNA)	NM_002548; NM_001386088	NM_001011851
RefSeq (protein)	NP_002539	NP_001011851
Location (UCSC)	n/a	Chr 11: 74.25 – 74.26 Mb
PubMed search
- Wikidata
View/Edit Human	View/Edit Mouse

Olfactory receptor 1D2 is a protein that in humans is encoded by the OR1D2 gene.

Olfactory receptors interact with odorant molecules in the nose, to initiate a neuronal response that triggers the perception of a smell. The olfactory receptor proteins are members of a large family of G-protein-coupled receptors (GPCR) arising from single coding-exon genes. Olfactory receptors share a 7-transmembrane domain structure with many neurotransmitter and hormone receptors and are responsible for the recognition and G protein-mediated transduction of odorant signals. The olfactory receptor gene family is the largest in the genome. The nomenclature assigned to the olfactory receptor genes and proteins for this organism is independent of other organisms.

== Expression ==
As well as bring expressed in the olfactory epithelium of the human nose, OR1D2 is special in that it is also expressed in human spermatozoa, where it is involved in sperm chemotaxis.

== Ligands ==
Bourgeonal is a reported ligand for OR1D2 that affects sperm chemotaxis.

Ligands include:

- Bourgeonal
- Canthoxal
- Cyclamal
- Floralazone
- Lilial
- Phenylacetaldehyde
- 3-phenylbutyraldehyde
- 3-phenylpropionaldehyde
- 4-phenylbutyraldehyde
- (p-tert-butylphenoxy)acetaldehyde

== See also ==
- Olfactory receptor
