= Helional =

Names
- IUPAC name 3-(1,3-Benzodioxol-5-yl)-2-methylpropanal
- Other names 2-Methyl-3-(3,4-methylenedioxyphenyl)propanal; 2-piperonylpropanal Helional; Ocean propanal Tropional

Identifiers
CAS Number	1205-17-0
3D model (JSmol)	Interactive image
ChemSpider	58337
ECHA InfoCard	100.013.528
PubChem CID	64805
UNII	L65EG8H6PA
CompTox Dashboard (EPA)	DTXSID7043908
- InChI: InChI=1S/C11H12O3/c1-8(6-12)4-9-2-3-10-11(5-9)14-7-13-10/h2-3,5-6,8H,4,7H2,1H3 Key: BOPPSUHPZARXTH-UHFFFAOYSA-N; InChI=1/C11H12O3/c1-8(6-12)4-9-2-3-10-11(5-9)14-7-13-10/h2-3,5-6,8H,4,7H2,1H3 Key: BOPPSUHPZARXTH-UHFFFAOYAR
- SMILES: CC(CC1=CC2=C(C=C1)OCO2)C=O

Properties
Chemical formula	C_{11}H_{12}O_{3}
Molar mass	192.214 g·mol^{−1}
Appearance	Colorless liquid
Odor	floral, herbaceous
Density	1.162 g/cm^{3}
Boiling point	282 °C (540 °F; 555 K)

Hazards
- GHS labelling
Pictograms	(GHS07: Exclamation mark)
Signal word	Warning
Hazard statements	H315, H319, H335
Precautionary statements	P261, P305+P351+P338
- Safety data sheet (SDS)
Legal status	BR: Class D1 (Drug precursors)
- Except where otherwise noted, data are given for materials in their standard state (at 25 °C [77 °F], 100 kPa). Infobox references

Helional (from heliotropin, from which is it commonly derived) is a chemical compound used as a perfume in soap and laundry detergent. Its aroma is described as "watery, fresh, green, ozone, cyclamen, hay". Chemically it is an aldehyde with a hydrocinnamaldehyde motif; a structural element which is present in a number of other important commercial fragrances and odorants.

== Synthesis ==
Several synthetic routes exist but the most common is a crossed-aldol condensation between piperonal (heliotropin) and propanal followed by selective hydrogenation of the intermediate alkene. This produces a racemic product.

== See also ==
- Cyclamen aldehyde
- Lilial
- Hexyl cinnamaldehyde
