= C6H12O =

The molecular formula C_{6}H_{12}O may refer to:

- Cyclohexanol
- Cyclopentyl methyl ether
- 3,3-Dimethylbutyraldehyde
- Ethyl isopropyl ketone
- Hexanal
- 2-Hexanone
- 3-Hexanone
- cis-3-Hexen-1-ol
- Methyl isobutyl ketone
- 2-Methylpentanal
- 3-Methyl-2-pentanone
- Oxepane
- Pinacolone
