= Isobutyraldehyde =

Chemical compound

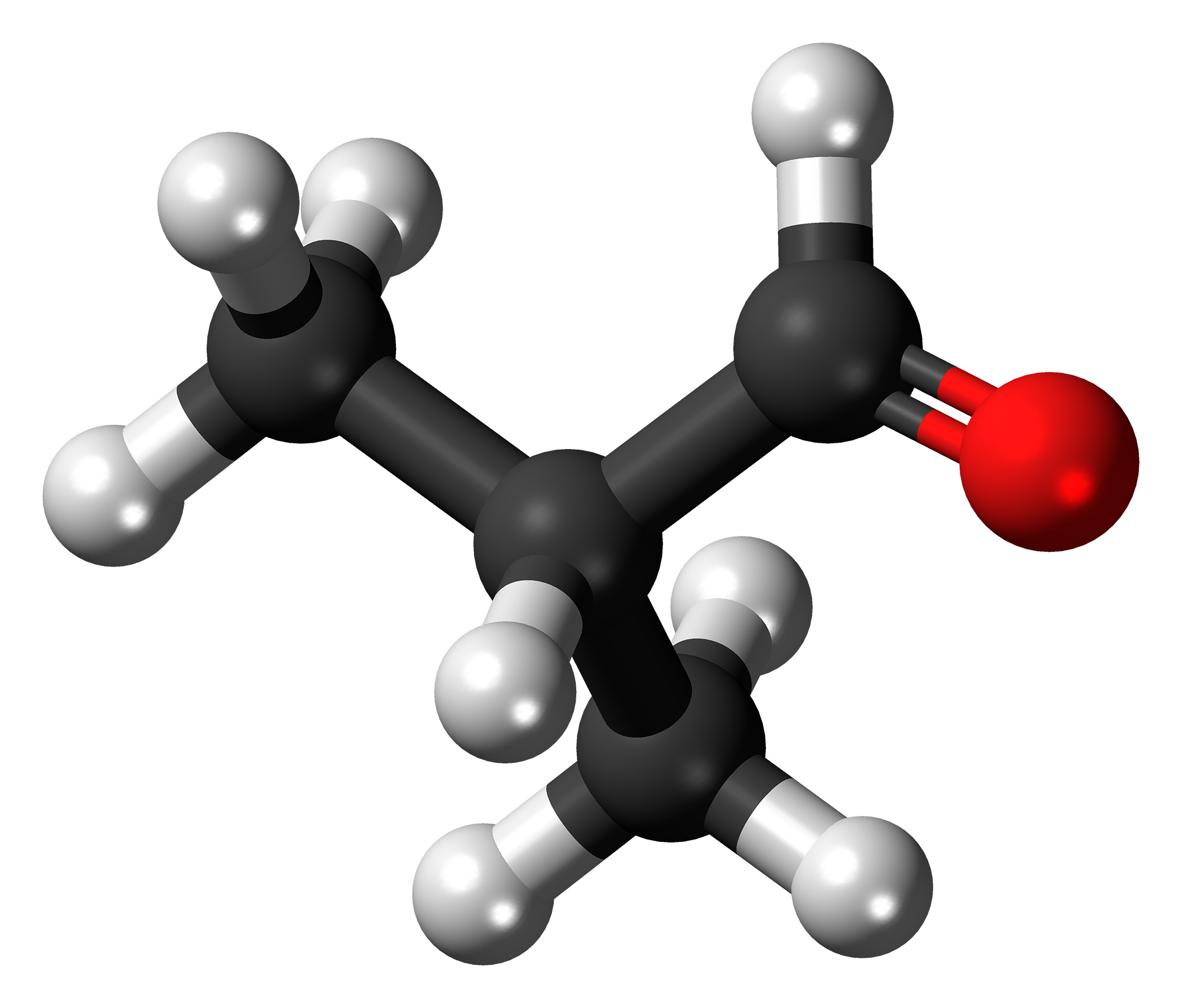

Names
- Preferred IUPAC name 2-Methylpropanal
- Other names 2-Methylpropionaldehyde

Identifiers
CAS Number	78-84-2
3D model (JSmol)	Interactive image
Beilstein Reference	605330
ChEBI	CHEBI:48943
ChemSpider	6313
ECHA InfoCard	100.001.045
EC Number	201-149-6
Gmelin Reference	1658
PubChem CID	6561
RTECS number	NQ4025000
UNII	C42E28168L
UN number	2045
CompTox Dashboard (EPA)	DTXSID9021635
- InChI: InChI=1S/C4H8O/c1-4(2)3-5/h3-4H,1-2H3 Key: AMIMRNSIRUDHCM-UHFFFAOYSA-N; InChI=1/C4H8O/c1-4(2)3-5/h3-4H,1-2H3 Key: AMIMRNSIRUDHCM-UHFFFAOYAE
- SMILES: CC(C)C=O

Properties
Chemical formula	C_{4}H_{8}O
Molar mass	72.11 g/mol
Appearance	colourless liquid
Odor	Pungent; straw-like
Density	0.79 g/cm^{3}
Melting point	−65 °C (−85 °F; 208 K)
Boiling point	63 °C (145 °F; 336 K)
Solubility in water	moderate
Solubility in other solvents	miscible in organic solvents
Magnetic susceptibility (χ)	−46.38·10^{−6} cm^{3}/mol
Refractive index (n_{D})	1.374

Hazards
- Occupational safety and health (OHS/OSH)
Main hazards	flammable
- GHS labelling
Pictograms	(GHS02: Flammable) (GHS07: Exclamation mark)
Signal word	Danger
Hazard statements	H225, H319
Precautionary statements	P210, P233, P240, P241, P242, P243, P264, P280, P303+P361+P353, P305+P351+P338, P337+P313, P370+P378, P403+P235, P501
Flash point	−19 °C; −2 °F; 254 K

Related compounds
Related alkyl aldehydes	Lilial Hexyl cinnamaldehyde 2-Methylundecanal
Related compounds	Butyraldehyde; Propionaldehyde
- Except where otherwise noted, data are given for materials in their standard state (at 25 °C [77 °F], 100 kPa). verify (what is ?) Infobox references

Isobutyraldehyde is the chemical compound with the formula (CH_{3})_{2}CHCHO. It is an aldehyde, isomeric with n-butyraldehyde (butanal). Isobutyraldehyde is made, often as a side-product, by the hydroformylation of propene. Its odour is described as that of wet cereal or straw. It undergoes the Cannizzaro reaction even though it has alpha hydrogen atom. It is a colorless volatile liquid.

== Synthesis ==
Isobutyraldehyde is produced industrially by the hydroformylation of propene. Several million tons are produced annually.

=== Biological routes ===
In the context of butanol fuel, isobutyraldehyde is of interest as a precursor to isobutanol. E. coli as well as several other organisms has been genetically modified to produce isobutanol. α-Ketoisovalerate, derived from oxidative deamination of valine, is prone to decarboxylation to give isobutyraldehyde, which is susceptible to reduction to the alcohol:

(CH_{3})_{2}CHC(O)CO_{2}H → (CH_{3})_{2}CHCHO + CO_{2}
(CH_{3})_{2}CHCHO + NADH + H^{+} → (CH_{3})_{2}CHCH_{2}OH + NAD^{+}

It can also be produced using engineered bacteria.

=== Other routes ===
Strong mineral acids catalyse the rearrangement of methallyl alcohol to isobutyraldehyde.

== Reactions ==
Hydrogenation of the aldehyde gives isobutanol. Oxidation gives methacrolein or methacrylic acid. Condensation with formaldehyde gives hydroxypivaldehyde. The latter is a precursor to vitamin B5.

Condensation with acetone followed by hydrogenation of the resulting alkene gives the solvent 5-methyl-2-hexanone.
