= 4-tert-Butylbenzaldehyde =

Names
- Preferred IUPAC name 4-tert-Butylbenzaldehyde

Identifiers
CAS Number	939-97-9
3D model (JSmol)	Interactive image
ChEMBL	ChEMBL242962
ChemSpider	63507
ECHA InfoCard	100.012.152
EC Number	213-367-9
PubChem CID	70324
UNII	QXF0QY8503
CompTox Dashboard (EPA)	DTXSID6027343
- InChI: InChI=1S/C11H14O/c1-11(2,3)10-6-4-9(8-12)5-7-10/h4-8H,1-3H3 Key: OTXINXDGSUFPNU-UHFFFAOYSA-N
- SMILES: [H]C(=O)c1ccc(cc1)C(C)(C)C

Properties
Chemical formula	C_{11}H_{14}O
Molar mass	162.232 g·mol^{−1}
Appearance	colourless liquid
Density	0.97
Boiling point	248.7 °C (479.7 °F; 521.8 K)
Solubility in water	120 mg/L

Hazards
- GHS labelling
Pictograms	(GHS06: Toxic) (GHS07: Exclamation mark) (GHS08: Health hazard) (GHS09: Environmental hazard)
Signal word	Danger
Hazard statements	H301, H302, H317, H334, H361, H410
Precautionary statements	P203, P233, P260, P264, P270, P271, P272, P273, P280, P284, P301+P316, P301+P317, P302+P352, P304+P340, P318, P321, P330, P333+P317, P342+P316, P362+P364, P391, P403, P405, P501
- Except where otherwise noted, data are given for materials in their standard state (at 25 °C [77 °F], 100 kPa). Infobox references

4-tert-Butylbenzaldehyde is an aromatic aldehyde and an important intermediate for the synthesis of synthetic aroma compounds.

== Synthesis ==
4-tert-Butylbenzaldehyde is notable as a rare example of industrial-scale electrochemistry. It is produced by BASF and Givaudan (typically as its methanol acetal) through a double anodic oxidation of 4-tert-butyltoluene on greater than 10,000 ton per year scale.

== Applications ==
Aldol condensation with either propionaldehyde or acetaldehyde, followed by hydrogenation, gives the fragrance compounds lilial and bourgeonal, respectively.
