= C12H24O =

The molecular formula C_{12}H_{24}O (molar mass: 184.32 g/mol, exact mass: 184.1827 u) may refer to:

- Dodecanal, or dodecyl aldehyde
- 2-Methylundecanal
