= C9H7N =

The molecular formula C_{9}H_{7}N (molar mass: 129.16 g/mol, exact mass: 129.0578 u) may refer to:

- Isoquinoline
- Quinoline
- Cinnamonitrile
