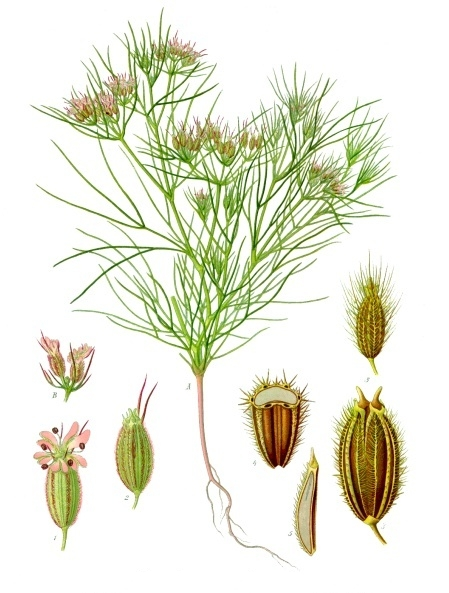

Scientific classification
- Kingdom: Plantae
- Clade: Embryophytes
- Clade: Tracheophytes
- Clade: Spermatophytes
- Clade: Angiosperms
- Clade: Eudicots
- Clade: Asterids
- Order: Apiales
- Family: Apiaceae
- Subfamily: Apioideae
- Tribe: Scandiceae
- Subtribe: Daucinae
- Genus: Cuminum; L.

Species
- including: Cuminum borszczowii; Cuminum cyminum; Cuminum setifolium; Cuminum sudanense

= Cuminum =

Genus of flowering plants

Cuminum is a genus of four flowering plants in the family Apiaceae. The most significant is Cuminum cyminum, source for the cumin seeds that are a popular spice.
