= Cuminaldehyde =

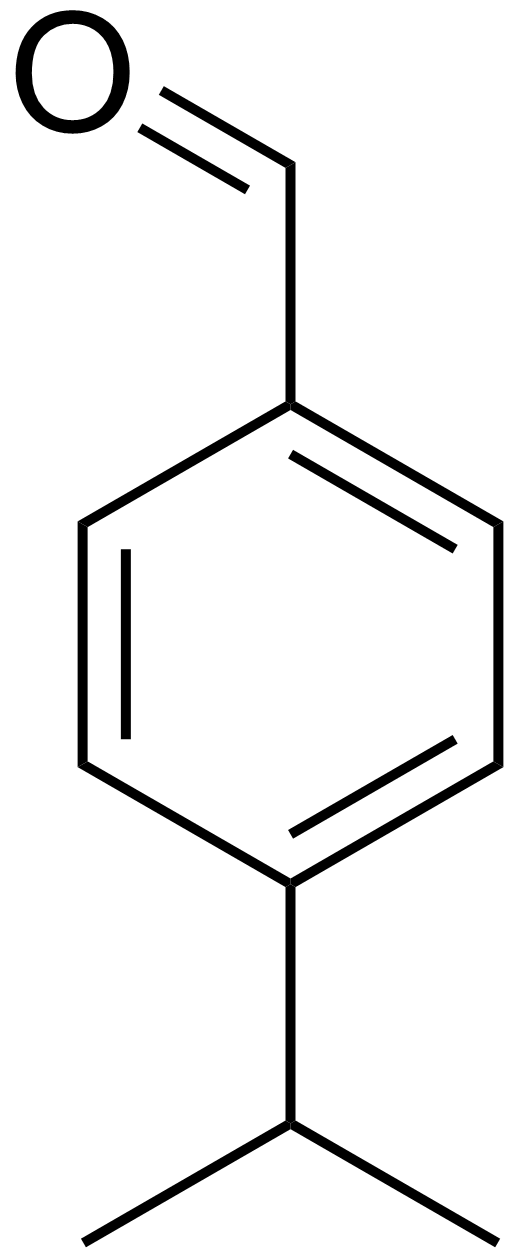

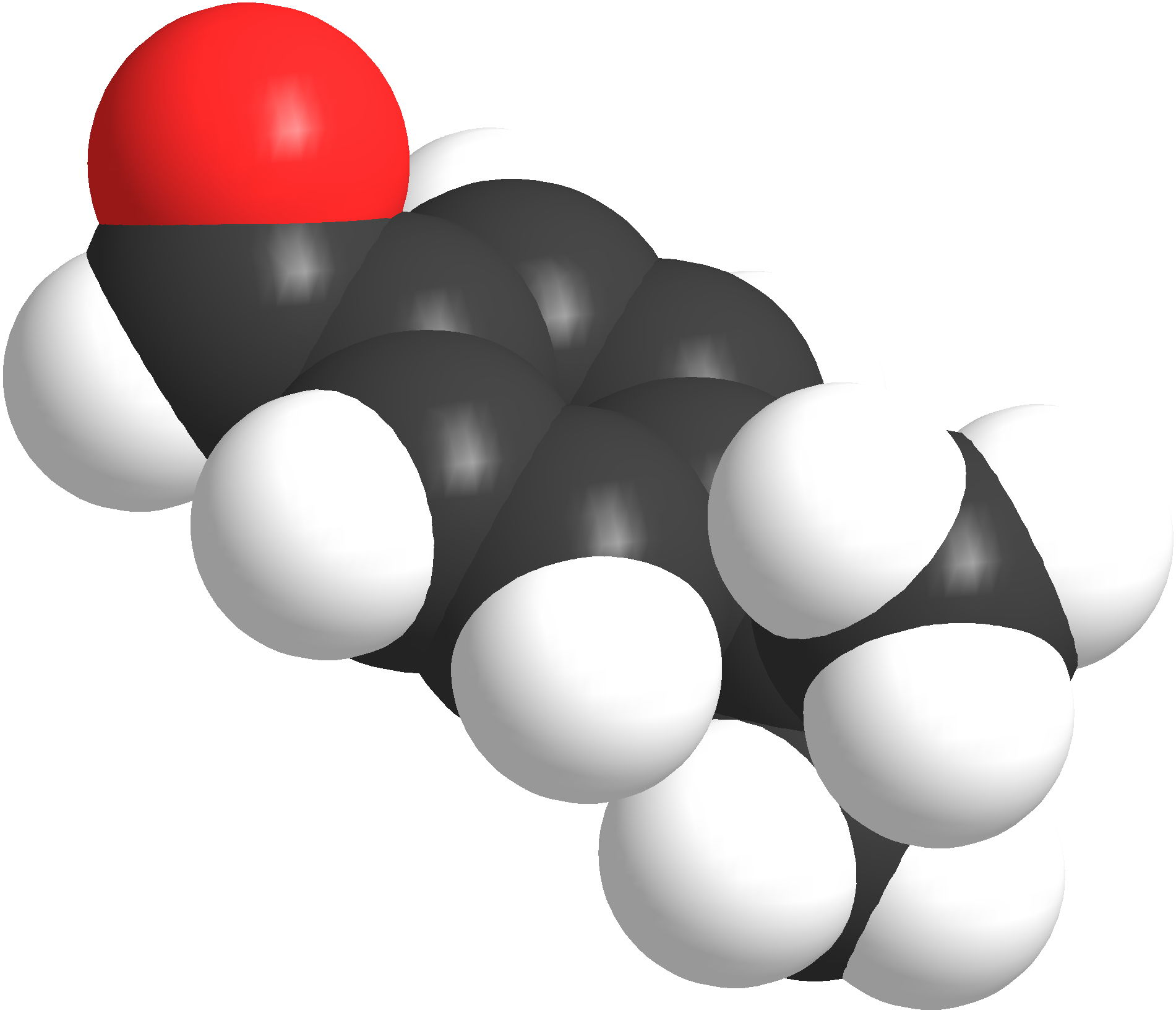

Names
- Preferred IUPAC name 4-Isopropylbenzaldehyde
- Systematic IUPAC name 4-(1-Methylethyl)benzenecarbaldehyde
- Other names p-Isopropylbenzaldehyde; 4-(1-Methylethyl)benzaldehyde; Cuminal; Cumaldehyde

Identifiers
CAS Number	122-03-2
3D model (JSmol)	Interactive image
ChEBI	CHEBI:28671
ChEMBL	ChEMBL161577
ChemSpider	21106431
ECHA InfoCard	100.004.107
EC Number	204-516-9
KEGG	C06577
PubChem CID	326
RTECS number	CU7000000
UNII	O0893NC35F
CompTox Dashboard (EPA)	DTXSID9021974
- InChI: InChI=1S/C10H12O/c1-8(2)10-5-3-9(7-11)4-6-10/h3-8H,1-2H3 Key: WTWBUQJHJGUZCY-UHFFFAOYSA-N; InChI=1/C10H12O/c1-8(2)10-5-3-9(7-11)4-6-10/h3-8H,1-2H3 Key: WTWBUQJHJGUZCY-UHFFFAOYAP
- SMILES: CC(C)c1ccc(C=O)cc1

Properties
Chemical formula	C_{10}H_{12}O
Molar mass	148.205 g·mol^{−1}
Appearance	Colorless oil
Density	0.978 g/cm^{3}
Boiling point	235.5 °C (455.9 °F; 508.6 K)
Solubility in water	Insoluble

Hazards
- GHS labelling
Pictograms	(GHS07: Exclamation mark)
Signal word	Warning
Hazard statements	H302, H317
Precautionary statements	P261, P264, P270, P272, P280, P301+P312, P302+P352, P321, P330, P333+P313, P363, P501
NFPA 704 (fire diamond)	1 2
Flash point	93 °C (199 °F; 366 K)

Related compounds
Related compounds	Benzaldehyde; Cumene; Cuminol
- Except where otherwise noted, data are given for materials in their standard state (at 25 °C [77 °F], 100 kPa). verify (what is ?) Infobox references

Cuminaldehyde (4-isopropylbenzaldehyde) is a natural organic compound with the molecular formula C_{10}H_{12}O. It is a benzaldehyde with an isopropyl group substituted in the 4-position.

== Uses and occurrence ==
Cuminaldehyde is responsible for the characteristic aroma of cumin seed. It has an intense aroma described as "spicy, cumin, green, herbal". Cuminaldehyde is a precursor to another commercially important fragrance, cyclamen aldehyde.

Cuminaldehyde has been investigated for inhibition of the fibrillation of alpha-synuclein,

Cuminaldehyde can be prepared synthetically by the reduction of 4-isopropylbenzoyl chloride or by the formylation of cumene.
