= Cinnamaldehyde =

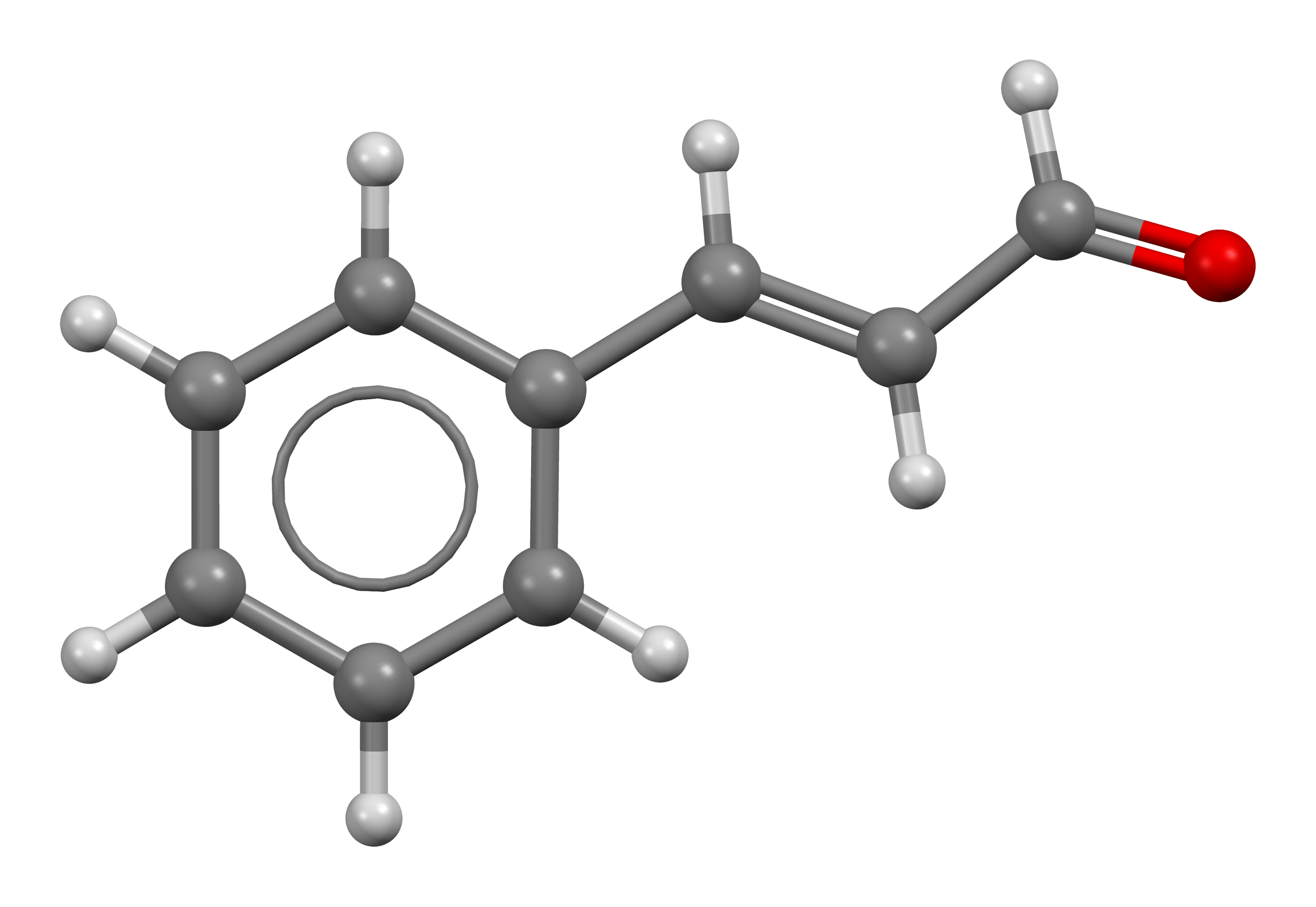

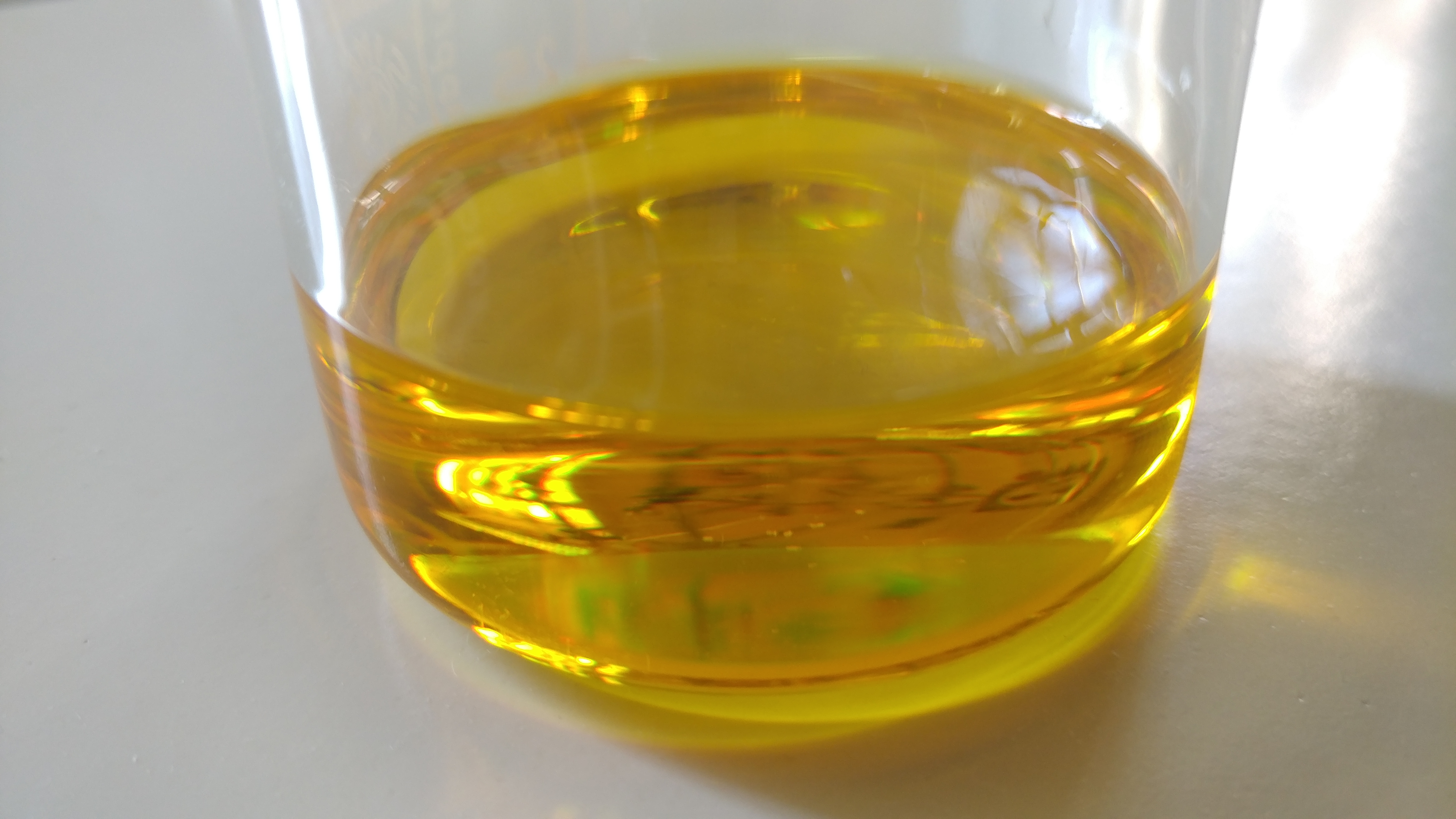

Names
- Preferred IUPAC name (2E)-3-Phenylprop-2-enal
- Other names: Cihinnamaldehyde; Cinnamal; Cinnamic aldehyde; trans-Cinnamaldehyde

Identifiers
CAS Number	14371-10-9
3D model (JSmol)	Interactive image
Beilstein Reference	1071571
ChEBI	CHEBI:16731
ChEMBL	ChEMBL293492
ChemSpider	553117
DrugBank	DB14184
ECHA InfoCard	100.111.079
EC Number	203-213-9
IUPHAR/BPS	2423
KEGG	C00903
PubChem CID	637511
RTECS number	GD6475000
UNII	SR60A3XG0F
CompTox Dashboard (EPA)	DTXSID6024834
- InChI: InChI=1S/C9H8O/c10-8-4-7-9-5-2-1-3-6-9/h1-8H/b7-4+ Key: KJPRLNWUNMBNBZ-QPJJXVBHSA-N; InChI=1/C9H8O/c10-8-4-7-9-5-2-1-3-6-9/h1-8H/b7-4+ Key: KJPRLNWUNMBNBZ-QPJJXVBHBH
- SMILES: c1ccc(cc1)/C=C/C=O

Properties
Chemical formula	C_{9}H_{8}O
Molar mass	132.16 g/mol
Appearance	Yellow oil
Odor	Pungent, cinnamon-like
Density	1.0497 g/mL
Melting point	−7.5 °C (18.5 °F; 265.6 K)
Boiling point	248 °C (478 °F; 521 K)
Solubility in water	Slightly soluble
Solubility	Soluble in ether, chloroform; Insoluble in petroleum ether; Miscible with alcohol, oils
Magnetic susceptibility (χ)	−7.48×10^{−5} cm^{3}/mol
Refractive index (n_{D})	1.6195

Hazards
- GHS labelling
Pictograms	(GHS07: Exclamation mark)
Signal word	Warning
Hazard statements	H315, H317, H319, H335
Precautionary statements	P261, P264, P271, P272, P280, P302+P352, P304+P340, P305+P351+P338, P312, P321, P332+P313, P333+P313, P337+P313, P362, P363, P403+P233, P405, P501
NFPA 704 (fire diamond)	2 2 0
Flash point	71 °C (160 °F; 344 K)
- Lethal dose or concentration (LD, LC)
LD_{50} (median dose)	3400 mg/kg (rat, oral)

Related compounds
Related compounds	Cinnamic acid
- Except where otherwise noted, data are given for materials in their standard state (at 25 °C [77 °F], 100 kPa). verify (what is ?) Infobox references

Cinnamaldehyde is an organic compound with the formula C_{9}H_{8}O or C_{6}H_{5}CH=CHCHO. Occurring naturally as predominantly the trans (E) isomer, it gives cinnamon its flavor and odor. It is a phenylpropanoid that is naturally synthesized by the shikimate pathway. This pale yellow, viscous liquid occurs in the bark of cinnamon trees and other species of the genus Cinnamomum. It is found in high concentrations in cinnamon essential oil.

== Structure and synthesis ==
Cinnamaldehyde was isolated from cinnamon essential oil in 1834 by Jean-Baptiste Dumas and Eugène-Melchior Péligot and synthesized in the laboratory by the Italian chemist Luigi Chiozza in 1854. Synonyms for Cinnamaldehyde include 3-Phenyl-2-propenal, Cinnamic aldehyde, trans-Cinnamaldehyde, Cinnamal, Cinnamyl aldehyde, Cassia aldehyde, 3-Phenylacrolein, and β-Phenylacrolein.

The natural product is trans-cinnamaldehyde. The molecule consists of a benzene ring attached to an unsaturated aldehyde. Cinnamaldehyde is an α,β-unsaturated carbonyl compound. Its color is due to the π → π* transition: increased conjugation in comparison with acrolein shifts this band towards the visible.

The molecule can be identified by characteristic spectroscopic signals. Infrared spectra show strong absorption bands near 1685 cm^{−1} (C=O stretch) and 1620 cm^{−1} (C=C stretch). In the proton nuclear magnetic resonance (^{1}H NMR) spectrum, the aldehydic proton resonates around 9.6 ppm, while aromatic and vinyl protons appear between 6.3 and 7.6 ppm.

=== Biosynthesis ===
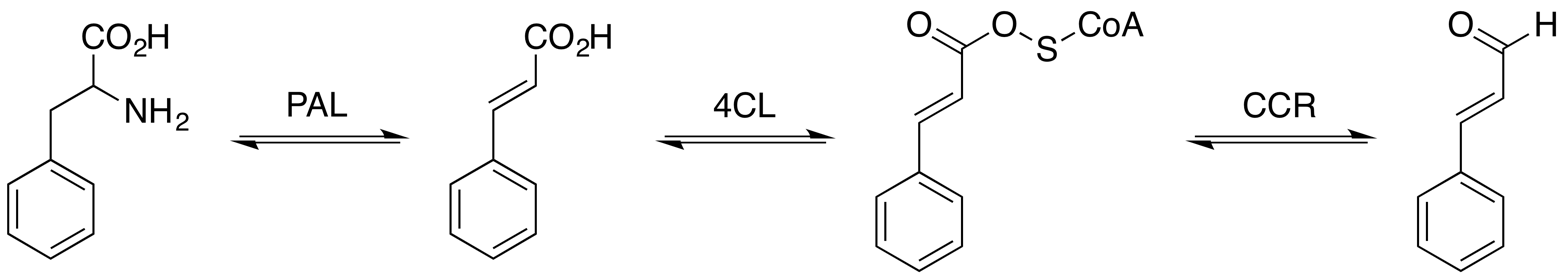
Pathway for the biosynthesis of trans-cinnamaldehyde.

Cinnamaldehyde is biosynthesized from phenylalanine. Deamination of L-phenylalanine into cinnamic acid is catalyzed by phenylalanine ammonia lyase (PAL). PAL catalyzes this reaction by a non-oxidative deamination. This deamination relies on the MIO prosthetic group of PAL. PAL gives rise to trans-cinnamic acid. In the second step, 4-coumarate–CoA ligase (4CL) converts cinnamic acid to cinnamoyl-CoA by an acid–thiol ligation. 4CL uses ATP to catalyze the formation of cinnamoyl-CoA. 4CL effects this reaction in two steps. 4CL forms a hydroxycinnamate–AMP anhydride, followed by a nucleophile attack on the carbonyl of the acyl adenylate. Finally, Cinnamoyl-CoA is reduced by NADPH catalyzed by CCR (cinnamoyl-CoA reductase) to form cinnamaldehyde.

=== Preparation ===
Several methods of laboratory synthesis exist. The compound can be prepared from related compounds such as cinnamyl alcohol. An early synthesis involved the aldol condensation of benzaldehyde and acetaldehyde. Cinnamaldehyde can also be obtained from the steam distillation of the oil of cinnamon bark.

Cinnamaldehyde is stable under dry, cool, and dark storage conditions but slowly oxidizes in air and light to form cinnamic acid and related degradation products. It is slightly soluble in water but miscible with organic solvents such as ethanol, ether, and chloroform.

== Applications ==
=== As a flavorant ===
The aroma of cinnamaldehyde is described as "sweet, spicy, aldehydic, aromatic, balsamic, cinnamyl, resinous, honey, powdery, cassia, and cinnamon". Thus the most obvious application for cinnamaldehyde is as flavoring in chewing gum, ice cream, candy, e-liquid and beverages; use levels range from 9 to 4,900 parts per million (ppm) (that is, less than 0.5%). It is also used in some perfumes of natural, sweet, or fruity scents. Almond, apricot, butterscotch, and other aromas may partially employ the compound for their pleasant smells. Cinnamaldehyde can be used as a food adulterant; powdered beechnut husk aromatized with cinnamaldehyde can be marketed as powdered cinnamon. Some breakfast cereals contain as much as 187 ppm cinnamaldehyde.

=== As an agrichemical ===
Cinnamaldehyde has been tested as a safe and effective insecticide against mosquito larvae. A concentration of 29 ppm of cinnamaldehyde kills half of Aedes aegypti mosquito larvae in 24 hours. Trans-cinnamaldehyde works as a potent fumigant and practical repellant for adult mosquitos. It also has antibacterial and antifungal properties.

=== Miscellaneous uses ===
Cinnamaldehyde is a corrosion inhibitor for steel and other alloys. It is believed to form a protective film on the metal surface.

In addition to flavor and fragrance applications, cinnamaldehyde is used in small amounts as a natural preservative in cosmetic and personal care formulations. It exhibits mild antimicrobial and antioxidant activity that helps extend product shelf life.

== Derivatives ==
Numerous derivatives of cinnamaldehyde are commercially useful. Dihydrocinnamyl alcohol (3-phenylpropanol) occurs naturally but is produced by double hydrogenation of cinnamaldehyde. It has the fragrances of hyacinth and lilac. Cinnamyl alcohol similarly occurs naturally and has the odor of lilac but can be also produced starting from cinnamaldehyde. Dihydrocinnamaldehyde is produced by the selective hydrogenation of the alkene subunit. α-Amylcinnamaldehyde and α-hexylcinnamaldehyde are important commercial fragrances, but they are not prepared from cinnamaldehyde. Hydrogenation of cinnamaldehyde, if directed to the alkene, gives hydrocinnamaldehyde. Aldol condensation of cinnamaldehyde with acetone forms dicinnamalacetone, which is used as an indicator. Cinnamonitrile can be produced by an elimination reaction of various oximes derived from cinnamaldehyde. It is used in fragrance products.

== Toxicology ==
Cinnamaldehyde is used in agriculture because of its low toxicity, but it is a skin irritant. Cinnamaldehyde may cause allergic contact stomatitis in sensitised individuals, however allergy to the compound is believed to be uncommon.

Cinnamaldehyde can contain traces of styrene, which arises during storage or transport. Styrene especially forms in high humidity and high temperatures.

== DNA repair ==
Cinnamaldehyde is a dietary antimutagen that effectively inhibits both induced and spontaneous mutations. Experimental evidence indicates that cinnamaldehyde induces a type of DNA damage in the bacterium Escherichia coli and in human cells that elicits recombinational DNA repair that then reduces spontaneous mutations. In mice, X-ray–induced chromosome aberrations were reduced when cinnamaldehyde was given orally to the mice after X-ray irradiation, perhaps due to cinnamaldehyde-stimulated DNA repair.

== Biological effects ==
Cinnamaldehyde is a bioactive electrophile that activates the transient receptor potential ankyrin 1 (TRPA1) ion channel, a chemosensory receptor expressed in sensory neurons and in the gastrointestinal tract. TRPA1 detects pungent or irritant compounds such as those found in cinnamon, mustard oil, and clove, producing the characteristic warming or burning sensation associated with these spices. In the gastrointestinal tract, TRPA1 activation by cinnamaldehyde influences the release of serotonin from enterochromaffin cells, linking chemical irritation with gut motility and sensory signaling. Because of this interaction, dietary cinnamaldehyde and other TRPA1 agonists are being studied for their potential to modulate gut–brain communication, relieve symptoms of irritable bowel syndrome (IBS), and alter visceral pain perception in humans.
