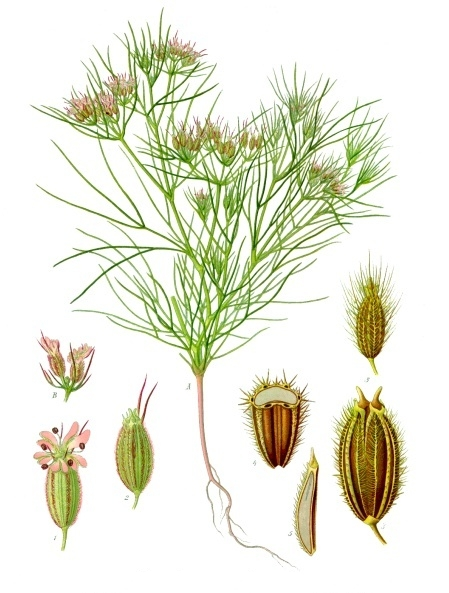

Scientific classification
- Kingdom: Plantae
- Clade: Tracheophytes
- Clade: Angiosperms
- Clade: Eudicots
- Clade: Asterids
- Order: Apiales
- Family: Apiaceae
- Genus: Cuminum
- Species: C. cyminum

Binomial name
- Cuminum cyminum L.

= Cumin =

Species of plant with seeds used as a spice

Cumin (/ˈkʌmɪn/, /ˈkjuːmɪn/; US also /ˈkuːmɪn/; Cuminum cyminum) is a flowering plant in the family Apiaceae, native to the Irano-Turanian Region. Its seeds – each one contained within a fruit, which is dried – are used in the cuisines of many cultures in both whole and ground form. Although cumin is used in traditional medicine, there is no high-quality evidence that it is safe or effective as a therapeutic agent.

== Etymology and pronunciation ==
The term comes via Middle English comyn, from Old English cymen (which is cognate with Old High German kumin) and Old French cummin, both from the Latin term cuminum. This in turn comes from the Ancient Greek κύμινον (kúminon), a Semitic borrowing related to Hebrew כמון (kammōn) and Arabic كمون (kammūn). They originate from the Akkadian 𒂵𒈬𒉡 (kamūnu), which in turn comes from the Sumerian 𒌑𒌁 (gamun)

The English word is traditionally pronounced /ˈkʌmɪn/ (KUM-in), like coming with an ⟨n⟩ instead of ⟨ng⟩ /ŋ/. American lexicographer Grant Barrett notes that this pronunciation now is rarely used in his country, replaced in the late 20th century by hyperforeignized /ˈkjuːmɪn/ (KYOO-min) and /ˈkuːmɪn/ (KOO-min).

== Description ==
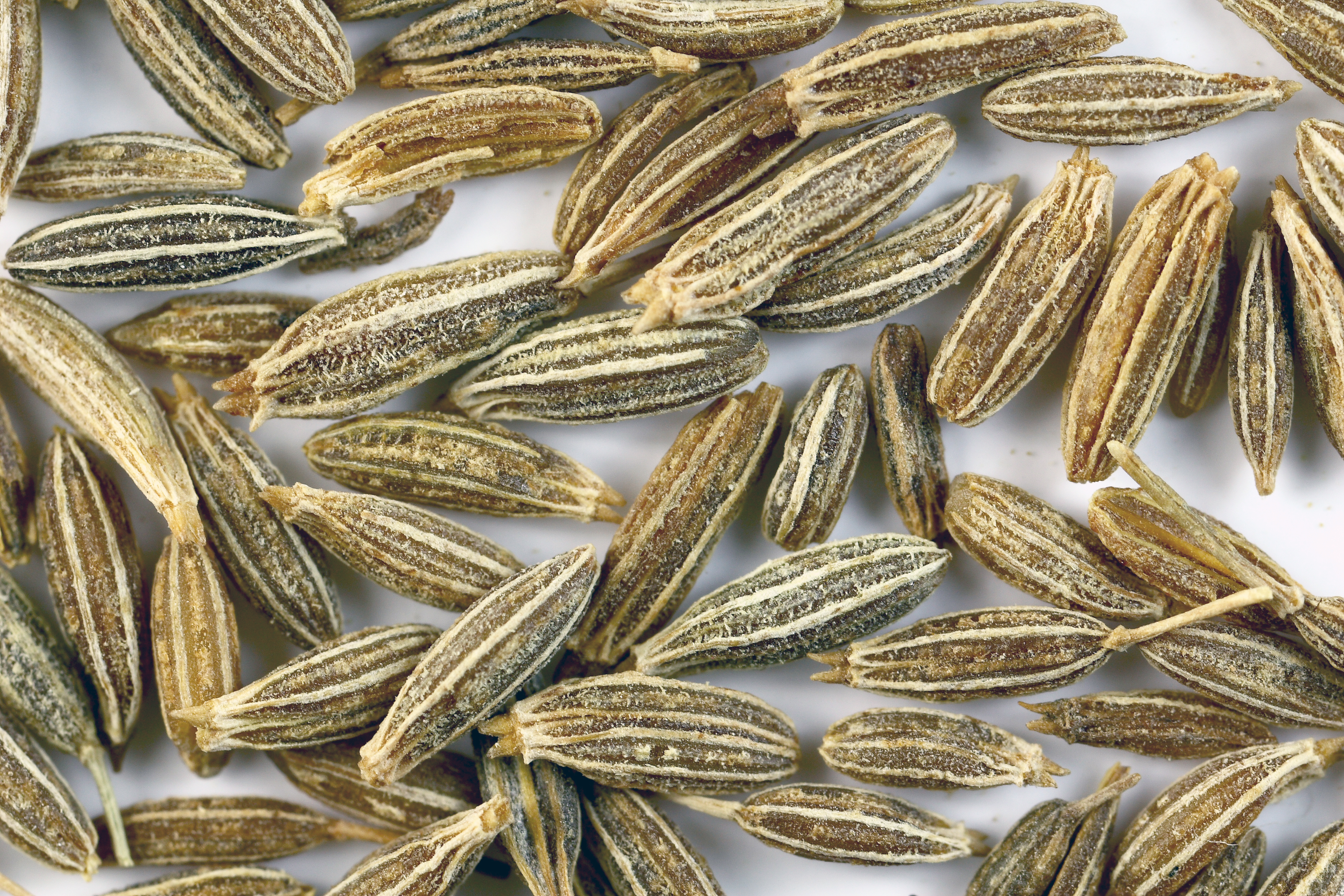
Cumin seeds, about 5 mm long.

Cumin is the dried seed of the herb Cuminum cyminum, a member of the parsley family. The cumin plant grows to 30–50 cm (12–20 in) tall and is harvested by hand. It is an annual herbaceous plant, with a slender, glabrous, branched stem that is 20–30 cm (8–12 in) tall and has a diameter of 3–5 cm (1 1/4–2 in). Each branch has two to three sub-branches. All the branches attain the same height, so the plant has a uniform canopy. The stem is colored grey or dark green. The leaves are 5–10 cm (2–4 in) long, pinnate or bipinnate, with thread-like leaflets. The flowers are small, white or pink, and borne in umbels. Each umbel has five to seven umbellets. The fruit is a lateral fusiform or ovoid achene 4–5 mm (1/6–1/5 in) long, containing two mericarps with a single seed. Cumin seeds have eight ridges with oil canals. They resemble caraway seeds, being oblong in shape, longitudinally ridged, and yellow-brown in color, like other members of the family Apiaceae (Umbelliferae) such as caraway, parsley, and dill.

=== Confusion with other spices ===
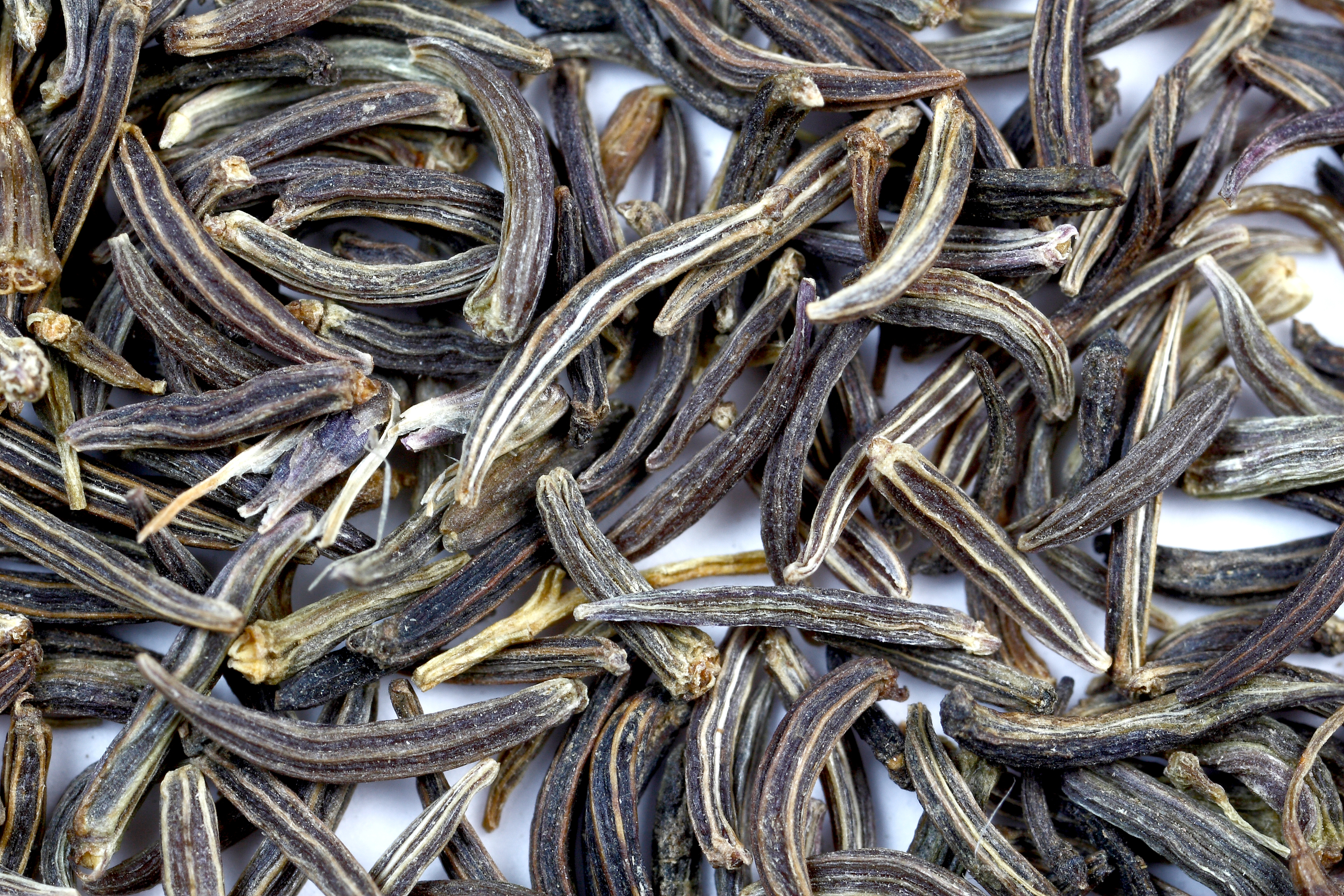
Black cumin seeds (Elwendia persica)

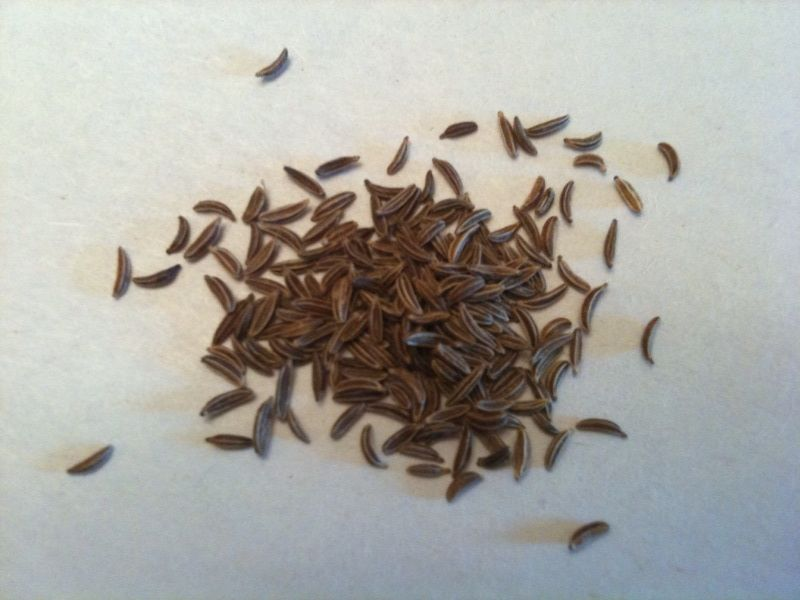
Caraway fruits are similar in shape and structure to cumin seeds

Cumin is sometimes confused with caraway (Carum carvi), another spice in the parsley family (Apiaceae). Many European and Asian languages do not distinguish clearly between the two; for example, in Indonesia both are called jinten. Many Slavic and Uralic languages refer to cumin as "Roman caraway" or "spice caraway". The distantly related Elwendia persica and Bunium bulbocastanum and the unrelated Nigella sativa are both sometimes called black cumin.

== History ==
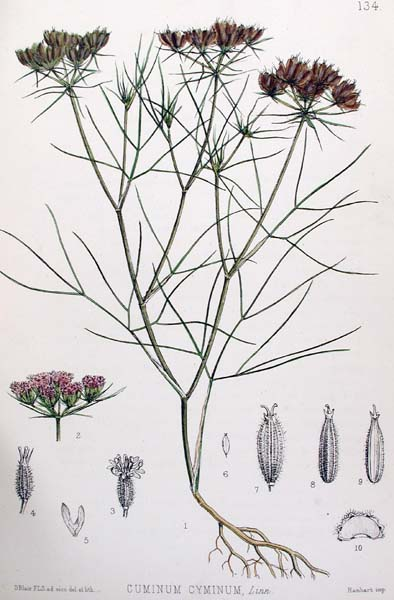
Cuminum cyminum Linn

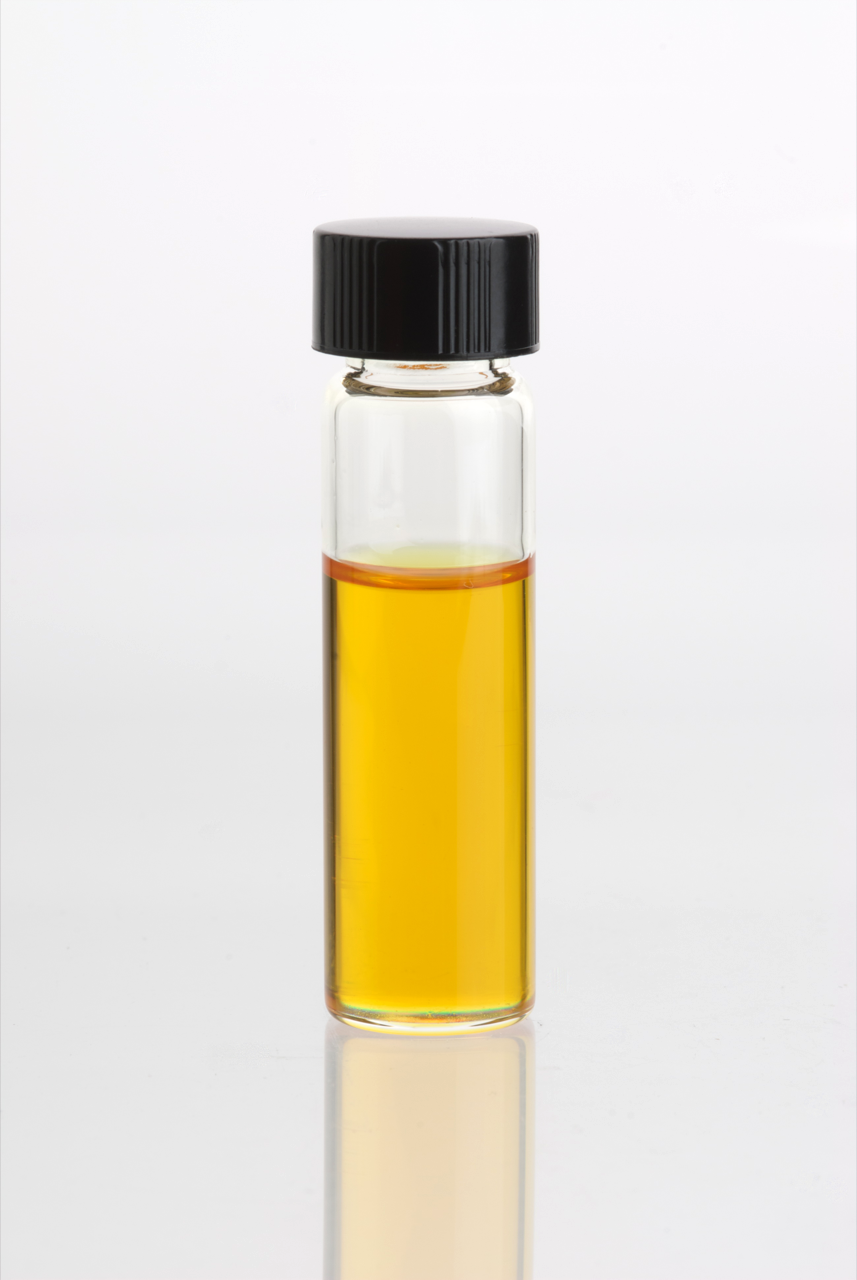
Cumin essential oil in clear glass vial

Likely originating in Central Asia, Southwestern Asia, or the Eastern Mediterranean, cumin has been in use as a spice for thousands of years. Seeds of wild cumin were excavated in the now-submerged settlement of Atlit-Yam, dated to the early 6th millennium BC. Seeds excavated in Syria were dated to the second millennium BC. They have also been reported from several New Kingdom levels of ancient Egyptian archaeological sites. In the ancient Egyptian civilization, cumin was used as a spice and as a preservative in mummification.

Cumin was a significant spice for the Minoans in ancient Crete. Ideograms for cumin appear in Linear A archive tablets documenting Minoan palace stores during the Late Minoan period. The ancient Greeks kept cumin at the dining table in its own container (much as pepper is frequently kept today), and this practice continues in Morocco. Cumin was also used heavily in ancient Roman cuisine. In India, it has been used for millennia as a traditional ingredient in innumerable recipes, and forms the basis of many other spice blends.

Cumin was introduced to the Americas by Spanish and Portuguese colonists. Black and green cumin are used in Persian cuisine. Today, the plant is mostly grown in the Indian subcontinent, Northern Africa, Mexico, Chile, and China. Since cumin is often used as part of bird food and exported to many countries, the plant can occur as an introduced species in many territories.

== Cultivation and production ==
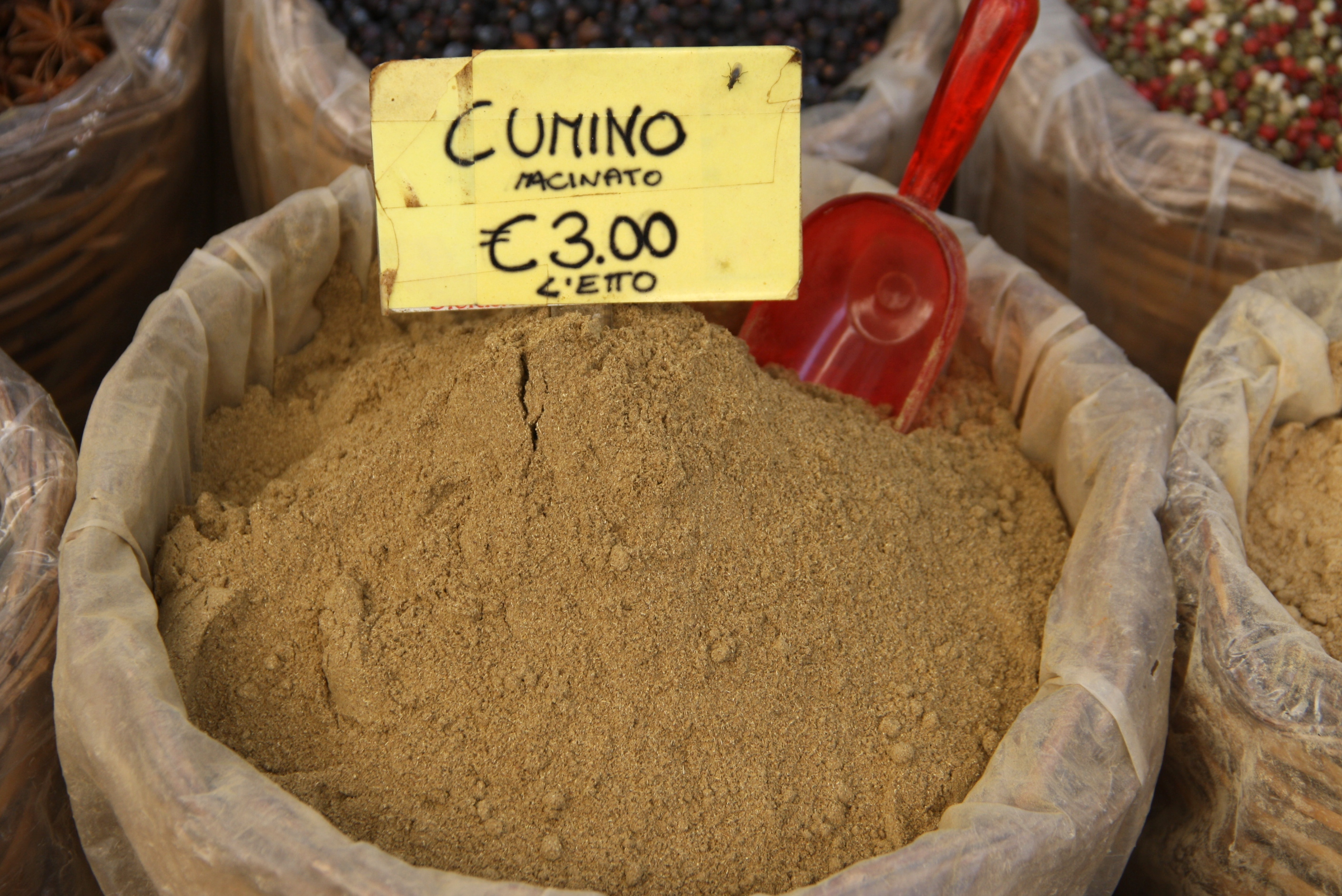
Ground cumin on display at the market in Ortigia, Syracuse (Italy)

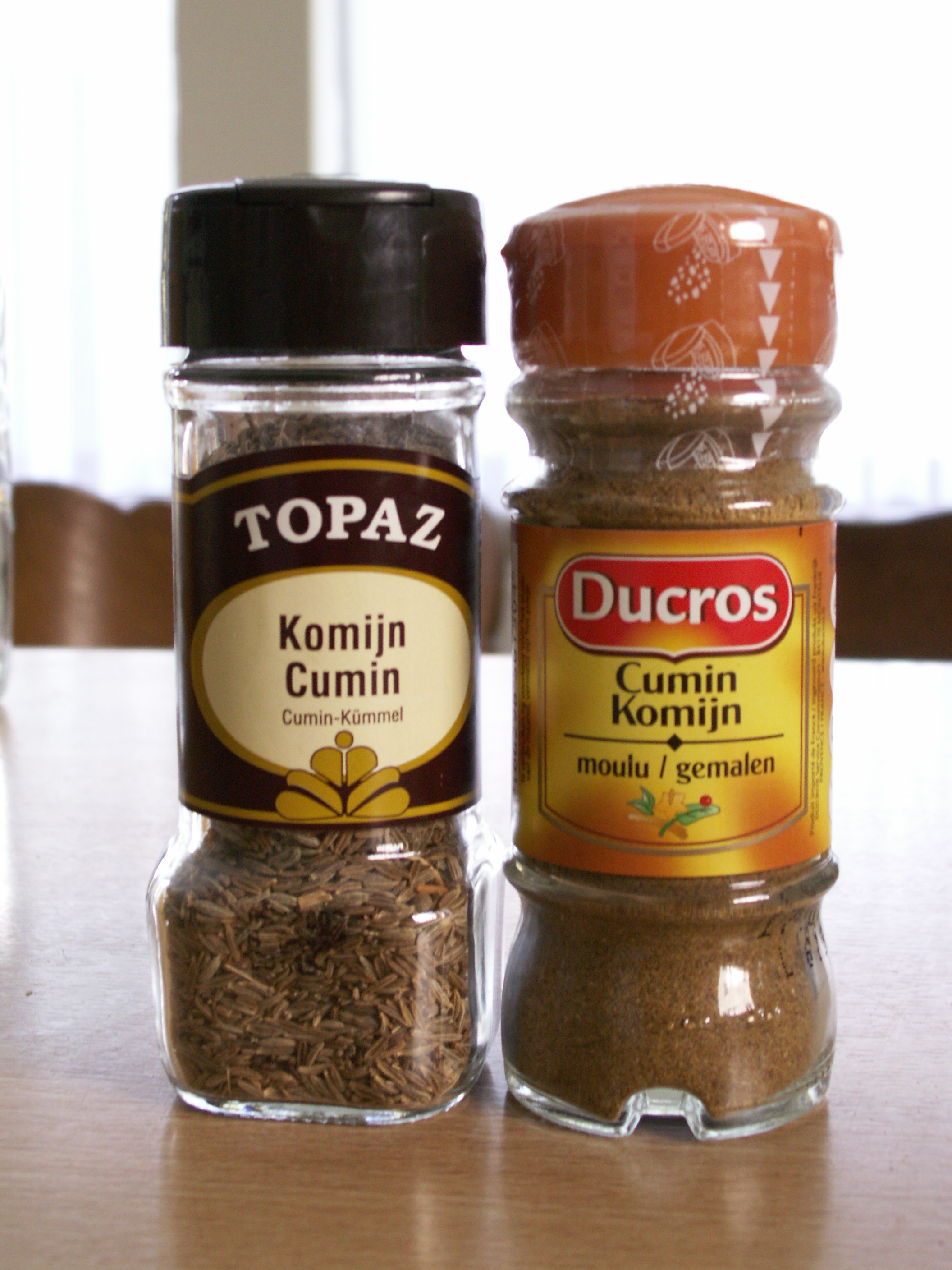
Commercially packaged whole and ground cumin seeds

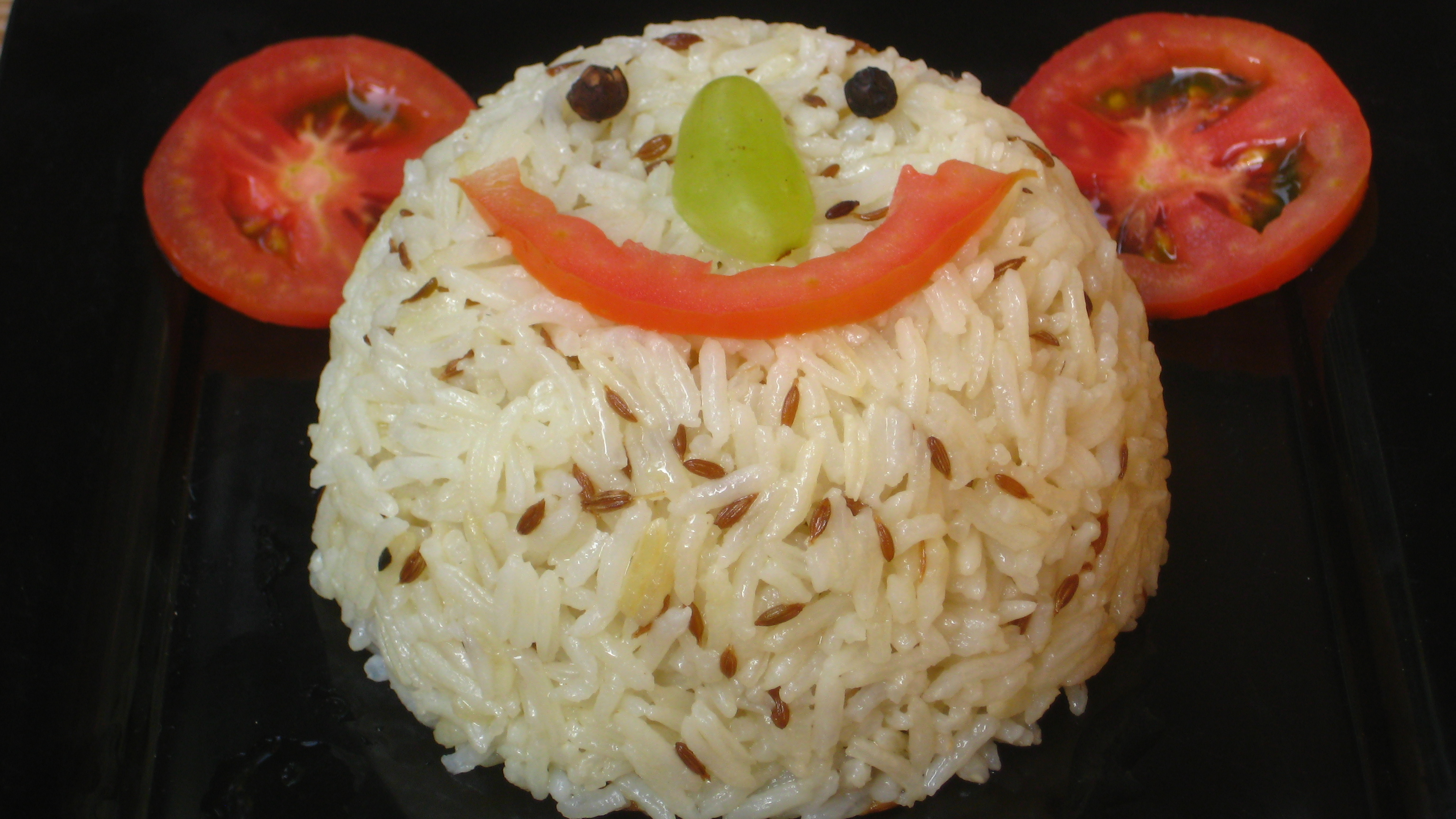
Jeera bhaat (cumin rice), an Indian dish

=== Cultivation areas ===
India is the world's largest producer of cumin, accounting for about 70%. The other major cumin-producing countries are Syria (13%), Turkey (5%), UAE (3%), and Iran. India produced 856,000 tons of cumin seed in the 2020–2021 fiscal year.

=== Climatic requirements ===
Cumin is a drought-tolerant tropical or subtropical crop. It is vulnerable to frost and has a growth season of 120 frost-free days. The optimum growth temperature ranges are between 25 and 30 °C (77 and 86 °F). The Mediterranean climate is most suitable for its growth. Cultivation of cumin requires a long, hot summer of three to four months. At low temperatures, the leaf color changes from green to purple. High temperatures might reduce growth period and induce early ripening. In India, cumin is sown from October until the beginning of December, and harvesting starts in February. In Syria and Iran, cumin is sown from mid-November until mid-December (extensions up to mid-January are possible) and harvested in June/July.

=== Grading ===
The three noteworthy sorts of cumin seeds in the market vary in seed shading, amount of oil, and flavor.

- Iranian
- Indian, South Asian
- Middle Eastern

=== Cultivation parameters ===
Cumin is grown from seed. The seeds need 2 to 5 °C (36 to 41 °F) for emergence, an optimum of 20–30 °C (68–86 °F) is suggested. Cumin is vulnerable to frost damage, especially at flowering and early seed formation stages. Methods to reduce frost damage are spraying with sulfuric acid (0.1%), irrigating the crop prior to frost incidence, setting up windbreaks, or creating an early-morning smoke cover. The seedlings of cumin are rather small and their vigor is low. Soaking the seeds for 8 hours before sowing enhances germination. For an optimal plant population, a sowing density of 12–15 kilograms per hectare (11–13 lb/acre) is recommended. Fertile, sandy, loamy soils with good aeration, proper drainage, and high oxygen availability are preferred. The pH optimum of the soil ranges from 6.8 to 8.3. Cumin seedlings are sensitive to salinity and emergence from heavy soils is rather difficult. Therefore, a proper seedbed preparation (smooth bed) is crucial for the optimal establishment of cumin.

Two sowing methods are used for cumin, broadcasting and line sowing. For broadcast sowing, the field is divided into beds and the seeds are uniformly broadcast in this bed. Afterwards, they are covered with soil using a rake. For line sowing, shallow furrows are prepared with hooks at a distance of 20 to 25 cm (8 to 10 in). The seeds are then placed in these furrows and covered with soil. Line sowing offers advantages for intercultural operations such as weeding, hoeing, or spraying. The recommended sowing depth is 1–2 cm and the recommended sowing density is around 120 plants per m^{2}. The water requirements of cumin are lower than those of many other species. Despite this, cumin is often irrigated after sowing to be sure that enough moisture is available for seedling development. The amount and frequency of irrigation depends on the climate conditions.

=== Cultivation management ===
The relative humidity in the center of origin of cumin is rather low. High relative humidity (i.e. wet years) favors fungal diseases. Cumin is especially sensitive to Alternaria blight and Fusarium wilt. Early-sown crops exhibit stronger disease effects than late-sown crops. The most important disease is Fusarium wilt, resulting in yield losses up to 80%. Fusarium is seed- or soil-borne and it requires distinct soil temperatures for the development of epidemics. Inadequate fertilization might favor Fusarium epidemics. Cumin blight (Alternaria) appears in the form of dark brown spots on leaves and stems. When the weather is cloudy after flowering, the incidence of the disease is increased. Another, but less important, disease is powdery mildew. Incidence of powdery mildew in early development can cause drastic yield losses because no seeds are formed. Later in development, powdery mildew causes discolored, small seeds.

Pathogens can lead to high reductions in crop yield. Cumin can be attacked by aphids (Myzus persicae) at the flowering stage. They suck the sap of the plant from tender parts and flowers. The plant becomes yellow, the seed formation is reduced (yield reduction), and the quality of the harvested product decreases. Heavily infested plant parts should be removed. Other important pests are the mites (Petrobia latens) which frequently attack the crop. Since the mites mostly feed on young leaves, the infestation is more severe on young inflorescences.

The open canopy of cumin is another problem. Only a low proportion of the incoming light is absorbed. The leaf area index of cumin is low (about 1.5). This might be a problem because weeds can compete with cumin for essential resources such as water and light and thereby lower yield. The slow growth and the short stature of cumin favors weed competition additionally. Two hoeing and weeding sessions (30 and 60 days after sowing) are needed for the control of weeds. During the first weeding session (30 days after sowing), thinning should be done, as well, to remove excess plants. The use of preplant or pre-emergence herbicides is very effective in India, but this kind of herbicide application requires soil moisture for a successful weed control.

=== Breeding ===
Cumin is a diploid species with 14 chromosomes (i.e. 2n = 14). The chromosomes of the different varieties have morphological similarities with no distinct variation in length and volume. Most of the varieties available today are selections. The variabilities of yield and yield components are high. Varieties are developed by sib mating in enclosed chambers or by biotechnology. Cumin is a cross-pollinator, i.e. the breeds are already hybrids. Therefore, methods used for breeding are in vitro regenerations, DNA technologies, and gene transfers. The in vitro cultivation of cumin allows the production of genetically identical plants. The main sources for the explants used in vitro regenerations are embryos, hypocotyl, shoot internodes, leaves, and cotyledons. One goal of cumin breeding is to improve its resistance to biotic (fungal diseases) and abiotic (cold, drought, salinity) stresses. The potential genetic variability for conventional breeding of cumin is limited and research about cumin genetics is scarce.

== Uses ==
Cumin seed is used as a spice for its distinctive flavor and aroma. Cumin can be found in some cheeses, such as Leyden cheese, and in some traditional breads from France. Cumin can be an ingredient in chili powder (often Tex-Mex or Mexican-style) and is found in achiote blends, adobos, sofrito, garam masala, curry powder, and bahaarat, and is used to flavor numerous commercial food products. In North Indian/Pakistani cuisine, it is often combined with coriander seeds in a powdered mixture called dhana jeera.

Cumin can be used ground or as whole seeds. It imparts an earthy, warming and aromatic character to food, making it a staple in certain stews and soups, as well as spiced gravies such as curry and chili. It is also used as an ingredient in some pickles and pastries.

=== Traditional ===
In India, the seeds are powdered and used in different forms such as kashaya (decoction), arishta (fermented decoction), and vati (tablet/pills), and processed with ghee (a semifluid clarified butter). In traditional medicine practices of several countries, dried cumin seeds are assumed to have medicinal purposes, although no scientific evidence has been found for its effectiveness as a drug or medicine.

Cumin seed
Nutritional value per 100 g
- Energy: 1,567 kJ (375 kcal)
- Carbohydrates: 44.24 g
- Sugars: 2.25 g
- Dietary fibre: 10.5 g
- Fat: 22.27 g
- Saturated: 1.535 g
- Monounsaturated: 14.04 g
- Polyunsaturated: 3.279 g
- Protein: 17.81 g
Vitamins and minerals
Vitamins	Quantity %DV^{†}
Vitamin A equiv. beta-Carotene	7% 64 μg 7% 762 μg
Vitamin A	1270 IU
Thiamine (B1)	52% 0.628 mg
Riboflavin (B2)	25% 0.327 mg
Niacin (B3)	29% 4.579 mg
Vitamin B6	26% 0.435 mg
Folate (B9)	3% 10 μg
Vitamin B12	0% 0 μg
Choline	4% 24.7 mg
Vitamin C	9% 7.7 mg
Vitamin E	22% 3.33 mg
Vitamin K	5% 5.4 μg
Minerals	Quantity %DV^{†}
Calcium	72% 931 mg
Iron	369% 66.36 mg
Magnesium	222% 931 mg
Manganese	145% 3.333 mg
Phosphorus	40% 499 mg
Potassium	60% 1788 mg
Sodium	7% 168 mg
Zinc	44% 4.8 mg
- Other constituents: Quantity
- Water: 8.06 g
- Reference
- ^{†}Percentages estimated using US recommendations for adults, except for potassium, which is estimated based on expert recommendation from the National Academies.

=== Volatiles and essential oil ===
Cuminaldehyde, cymene, and terpenoids are the major volatile components of cumin oil, which is used for a variety of flavors, perfumes, and essential oil. Cumin oil may be used as an ingredient in some cosmetics.

=== Aroma ===
Cumin's flavor and warm aroma are due to its essential oil content, primarily the aroma compound cuminaldehyde. Other aroma compounds of toasted cumin are the substituted pyrazines, 2-ethoxy-3-isopropylpyrazine, 2-methoxy-3-sec-butylpyrazine, and 2-methoxy-3-methylpyrazine. Other components include γ-terpinene, safranal, p-cymene, and β-pinene.

=== Nutritional value ===
Cumin seeds are 8% water, 18% protein, 22% fat, and 44% carbohydrates (table).

In a reference amount of 100 grams (3.5 oz), cumin seeds provide 375 calories of food energy and high amounts of the daily value for B vitamins, vitamin E, and several dietary minerals, especially iron, magnesium, and manganese (table).
