= Dhana jiru =

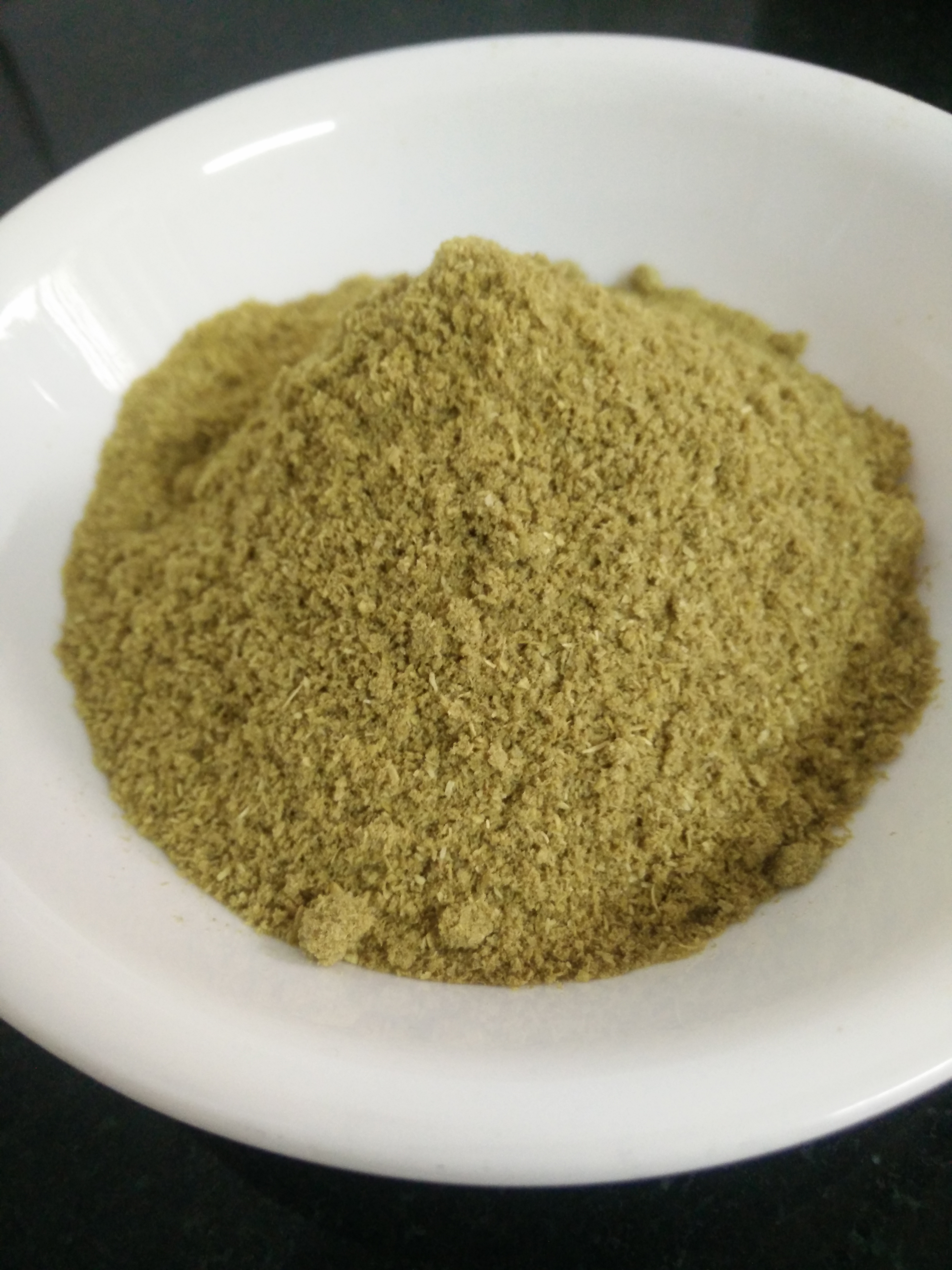
Dhana jiru

Dhana jiru is a North Indian spice mix consisting primarily of ground, roasted cumin (jiru) and coriander (dhana) seeds. Some cooks add a variety of other spices such as red chili powder, cassia leaves, cinnamon bark, and black pepper, which make the mixture somewhat similar to garam masala.

== See also ==
- List of Indian spices
