= Bourgeonal =

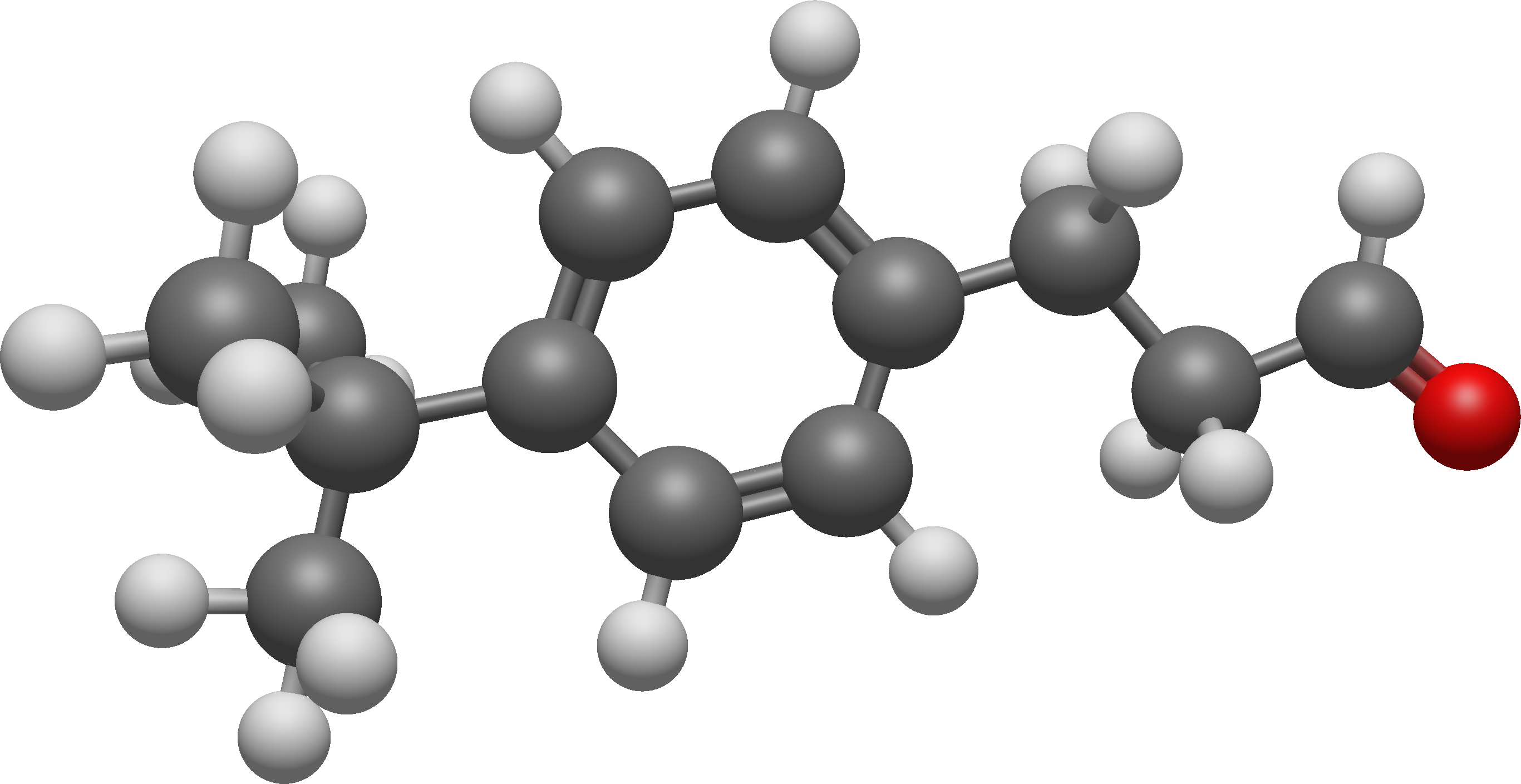

Names
- Preferred IUPAC name 3-(4-tert-Butylphenyl)propanal

Identifiers
CAS Number	18127-01-0
3D model (JSmol)	Interactive image
ChemSpider	58364
ECHA InfoCard	100.038.182
EC Number	242-016-2
PubChem CID	64832
UNII	H3XVS6E70V
CompTox Dashboard (EPA)	DTXSID6044808
- InChI: InChI=1/C13H18O/c1-13(2,3)12-8-6-11(7-9-12)5-4-10-14/h6-10H,4-5H2,1-3H3 Key: FZJUFJKVIYFBSY-UHFFFAOYAX
- SMILES: O=CCCc1ccc(cc1)C(C)(C)C

Properties
Chemical formula	C_{13}H_{18}O
Molar mass	190.286 g·mol^{−1}
Appearance	Pale yellow liquid
Density	0.938 g/cm^{3}
Boiling point	265.1 °C (509.2 °F; 538.2 K)
- Except where otherwise noted, data are given for materials in their standard state (at 25 °C [77 °F], 100 kPa). Infobox references

Bourgeonal (a trade name for an organic compound with the formula (CH_{3})_{3}CC_{6}H_{4}CH_{2}CH_{2}CHO. It is an aromatic aldehyde used in perfumery. It has a fragrance reminiscent of lily of the valley, otherwise described as floral, watery, green, and aldehydic. It is a colorless liquid although commercial samples can appear yellow.

== Synthesis ==
Industrial synthesis of bourgeonal involves a mixed aldol reaction of 4-tert-butylbenzaldehyde and acetaldehyde, followed by hydrogenation. Alternatively it may be produced by the Heck reaction of 1-bromo-4-tert-butylbenzene with 2-hydroxymethylpropene followed by isomerisation.

== Biological effects ==
In a 2003 study it was found that in vitro, bourgeonal acts as a chemo-attractant for human spermatozoa, activating an olfactory receptor called OR1D2 (formerly called hOR17-4) which opens calcium ion channels in the sperm, leading them to swim twice as fast. Bourgeonal is suspected to be involved in helping sperm locate the ovum.

As of 2010, bourgeonal is the only known odor substance to which males have a higher average sensitivity than females. This is thought to be because the same olfactory receptor (OR1D2) is expressed in non-olfactory tissue in sperm cells as well as the olfactory tissue of the nose. The involvement with sperm chemotaxis causes an evolutionary pressure for males (sexual selection) that causes them to have more OR1D2 receptors on average, both in the nose as well as in sperm.

== Safety ==
Use of bourgeonal is restricted because, like lilial, it readily degraded to 4-tert-butylbenzoic acid, a reproductive toxin.
