= Hydrocinnamaldehyde =

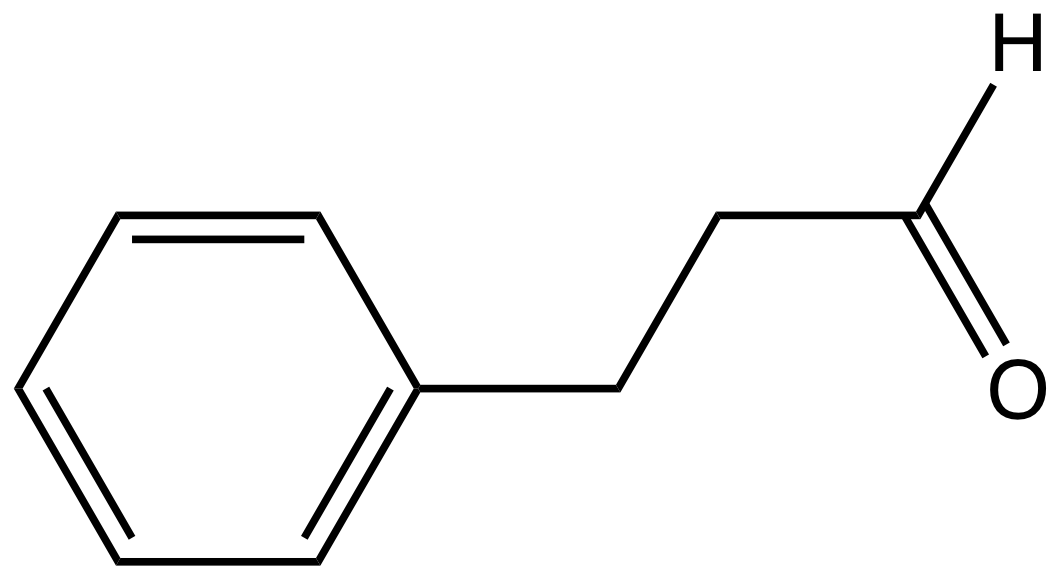

Names
- Preferred IUPAC name 3-Phenylpropanal
- Other names 3-Phenylpropional; 3-Phenylpropionaldehyde; β-Phenylpropionaldehyde

Identifiers
CAS Number	104-53-0
3D model (JSmol)	Interactive image
ChEBI	CHEBI:39940
ChEMBL	ChEMBL440161
ChemSpider	7421
ECHA InfoCard	100.002.920
EC Number	203-211-8
PubChem CID	7707
UNII	LP1E86N30T
CompTox Dashboard (EPA)	DTXSID0047610
- InChI: InChI=1S/C9H10O/c10-8-4-7-9-5-2-1-3-6-9/h1-3,5-6,8H,4,7H2 Key: YGCZTXZTJXYWCO-UHFFFAOYSA-N
- SMILES: C1=CC=C(C=C1)CCC=O

Properties
Chemical formula	C_{9}H_{10}O
Molar mass	134.178 g·mol^{−1}
Appearance	colorless liquid
Density	1.018 g/cm^{3}
Melting point	−42 °C (−44 °F; 231 K)
Boiling point	224 °C (435 °F; 497 K)

Hazards
- GHS labelling
Pictograms	(GHS07: Exclamation mark)
Signal word	Warning
Hazard statements	H315, H319
Precautionary statements	P264, P280, P302+P352, P305+P351+P338, P321, P332+P313, P337+P313, P362
- Except where otherwise noted, data are given for materials in their standard state (at 25 °C [77 °F], 100 kPa). Infobox references

Hydrocinnamaldehyde is the organic compound with the formula C_{6}H_{5}CH_{2}CH_{2}CHO. It is produced by the hydrogenation of cinnamaldehyde. The compound is used in many mechanistic studies. It is a common substrate in organic synthesis.

It is used in flavours and fragrances for its "fresh, cortex, green, leafy, foliage, balsamic, storax, aldehydic, floral, melon" aroma.
