= 2-Methylpentanal =

Names
- Preferred IUPAC name 2-Methylpentanal

Identifiers
CAS Number	123-15-9
3D model (JSmol)	Interactive image
ChEBI	CHEBI:89986
ChEMBL	ChEMBL2270061
ChemSpider	28985
ECHA InfoCard	100.004.188
EC Number	204-605-2
PubChem CID	31245
UNII	64L45T2504
UN number	2367
CompTox Dashboard (EPA)	DTXSID9021978
- InChI: InChI=1S/C6H12O/c1-3-4-6(2)5-7/h5-6H,3-4H2,1-2H3 Key: FTZILAQGHINQQR-UHFFFAOYSA-N
- SMILES: CCCC(C)C=O

Properties
Chemical formula	C_{6}H_{12}O
Molar mass	100.161 g·mol^{−1}
Appearance	colorless liqiud
Density	0.86 g/cm^{3}
Boiling point	137–138 °C (279–280 °F; 410–411 K)
Refractive index (n_{D})	1.45

Hazards
- GHS labelling
Pictograms	(GHS05: Corrosive) (GHS07: Exclamation mark)
Signal word	Danger
Hazard statements	H225, H315, H319
Precautionary statements	P210, P233, P240, P241, P242, P243, P264, P264+P265, P273, P280, P302+P352, P303+P361+P353, P305+P351+P338, P321, P332+P317, P337+P317, P362+P364, P370+P378, P403+P235, P501
- Except where otherwise noted, data are given for materials in their standard state (at 25 °C [77 °F], 100 kPa). Infobox references

2-Methylpentanal is an organic compound with the formula CH_{3}CH_{2}CH_{2}CH(CH_{3})CHO. It is a colorless liquid. The compound is a chiral aldehyde. It serves as a precursor to the commercial tranquilizer meprobamate. It is prepared by aldol condensation of propionaldehyde followed by dehydration and hydrogenation of the aldol product.
