= Α-Hexylcinnamaldehyde =

α-Hexylcinnamaldehyde
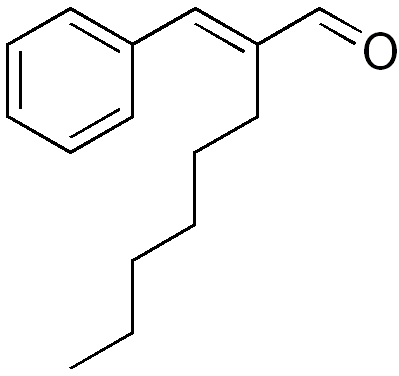

Names
- IUPAC name 2-Benzylideneoctanal
- Other names Hexyl cinnamal 2-(Phenylmethylidene)octanal

Identifiers
CAS Number	101-86-0; 165184-98-5 (2E); 364364-06-7 (2Z)
3D model (JSmol)	Interactive image
ChEBI	CHEBI:55365
ChemSpider	1267362
ECHA InfoCard	100.002.713
PubChem CID	1550884
UNII	7X6O37OK2I; E9947QRR9O (2E); H2WS93I0OP (2Z)
CompTox Dashboard (EPA)	DTXSID4026684
- InChI: InChI=1S/C15H20O/c1-2-3-4-6-11-15(13-16)12-14-9-7-5-8-10-14/h5,7-10,12-13H,2-4,6,11H2,1H3/b15-12+ Key: GUUHFMWKWLOQMM-NTCAYCPXSA-N; InChI=1/C15H20O/c1-2-3-4-6-11-15(13-16)12-14-9-7-5-8-10-14/h5,7-10,12-13H,2-4,6,11H2,1H3/b15-12+ Key: GUUHFMWKWLOQMM-NTCAYCPXBH
- SMILES: O=C\C(=C\c1ccccc1)CCCCCC

Properties
Chemical formula	C_{15}H_{20}O
Molar mass	216.324 g·mol^{−1}
Density	0.95 g/mL
Boiling point	308 °C (586 °F; 581 K)
Solubility in water	2.75 mg/L

Related compounds
Related alkyl aldehydes	Isobutyraldehyde; Lilial; 2-Methylundecanal
- Except where otherwise noted, data are given for materials in their standard state (at 25 °C [77 °F], 100 kPa). verify (what is ?) Infobox references

α-Hexylcinnamaldehyde (hexyl cinnamal) is a common additive in the perfume and cosmetic industry as aroma substance. It is found naturally in the essential oil of chamomile. It is a pale yellow to yellow liquid to solid, which is nearly insoluble in water but soluble in oils. The commercial material often contains low levels of 2,6-di-tert-butyl-4-methoxyphenol as a stabilizer. It is a derivative of cinnamaldehyde with a hexyl substituent.

One supplier reported that its hexyl cinnamaldehyde (or "hexyl cinnamic aldehyde") contained at least 90% trans isomer.

== Synthesis ==
Hexyl cinnamaldehyde is typically produced via crossed-aldol condensation of octanal and benzaldehyde.

== Safety ==
Hexyl cinnamaldehyde is known to cause contact allergies in some individuals but the rate of incidence is low, with patch tests indicating ~0.1% of people to be susceptible.
