= 2-Methylundecanal =

- Skeletal formula of 2-methylundecanal

Names
- Preferred IUPAC name 2-Methylundecanal

Identifiers
CAS Number	110-41-8
3D model (JSmol)	Interactive image
ChEMBL	ChEMBL3182849
ChemSpider	54990; 5291693 (2R)-2-methyl; 553128 (2S)-2-methyl
ECHA InfoCard	100.003.424
EC Number	203-765-0
PubChem CID	61031; 6915922 (2R)-2-methyl; 637522 (2S)-2-methyl
RTECS number	YQ1509000
UNII	S94QNS2VY5
CompTox Dashboard (EPA)	DTXSID9047629
- InChI: InChI=1S/C12H24O/c1-3-4-5-6-7-8-9-10-12(2)11-13/h11-12H,3-10H2,1-2H3 Key: NFAVNWJJYQAGNB-UHFFFAOYSA-N; InChI=1/C12H24O/c1-3-4-5-6-7-8-9-10-12(2)11-13/h11-12H,3-10H2,1-2H3 Key: NFAVNWJJYQAGNB-UHFFFAOYAB
- SMILES: CCCCCCCCCC(C)C=O

Properties
Chemical formula	C_{12}H_{24}O
Molar mass	184.323 g·mol^{−1}
Appearance	Colourless liquid
Density	830.3 mg cm^{−3}
Boiling point	171 °C; 340 °F; 444 K
Refractive index (n_{D})	1.432

Hazards
- GHS labelling
Pictograms	(GHS07: Exclamation mark) (GHS09: Environmental hazard)
Signal word	Warning
Hazard statements	H315, H317, H410
Precautionary statements	P261, P264, P272, P273, P280, P302+P352, P305+P351+P338, P321, P332+P313, P333+P313, P337+P313, P362, P363, P391, P501
Flash point	93.4 °C (200.1 °F; 366.5 K)

Related compounds
Related alkyl aldehydes	Hexyl cinnamaldehyde Isobutyraldehyde; Lilial
- Except where otherwise noted, data are given for materials in their standard state (at 25 °C [77 °F], 100 kPa). verify (what is ?) Infobox references

2-Methylundecanal is an organic compound that is found naturally in kumquat peel oil. This compound smells herbaceous, orange, and ambergris-like. At high dilution it has a flavor similar to honey and nuts. It is a colorless or pale yellow liquid that is soluble in organic solvents such as ether and ethanol. It is used as a fragrance component in soaps, detergents, and perfumes.

== Preparation ==
The first synthesis of 2-methylundecanal was recorded by Georges Darzens in 1904 from methyl nonyl ketone and ethyl chloroacetate. This method of synthesis can be used to produce a variety of aldehydes and became known as the Darzens reaction and is still used today. 2-Methylundecanal is synthesized in industry by two main routes. The first route, like Darzens, involves converting methyl nonyl ketone to its glycidate by allowing it to react with alkyl chloroacetate. The glycidate then undergoes saponification followed by decarboxylation.

CH_{3}(CH_{2})_{8}C(O)CH_{3} + ClCH_{2}CO_{2}R → CH_{3}(CH_{2})_{8}CH(CH_{3})OCH(CO_{2}R) + HCl
CH_{3}(CH_{2})_{8}CCH_{3}OCCO_{2}R + H_{2}O → CH_{3}(CH_{2})_{8}CH(CH_{3})CHO + CO_{2} + ROH

The second method for the synthesis of 2-methylundecanal begins with the conversion of undecanal to 2-methyleneundecanal by allowing it to react with formaldehyde in the presence of base. The 2-methyleneundecanal is then hydrogenated to give 2-methylundecanal. The resulting solution is over 50% 2-methyleneundecanal. The double bond of this compound is hydrogenated and the resulting 2-methylundecanal is separated from the by-products using fractional distillation. The required undecanal in the first step is generated from 1-decene by hydroformylation.

CH_{3}(CH_{2})_{7}CH_{2}=CH_{2} + H_{2} + CO → CH_{3}(CH_{2})_{10}CHO
CH_{3}(CH_{2})_{10}CHO + HCHO → CH_{3}(CH_{2})_{8}C(CH_{2})CHO + H_{2}O
CH_{3}(CH_{2})_{8}C(CH_{2})CHO + H_{2} → CH_{3}(CH_{2})_{8}CH(CH_{3})CHO

== Chirality ==
2-Methylundecanal contains one asymmetric carbon atom.

(R)-2-Methylundecanal (above) and (S)-2-Methylundecanal (below)

The enantiomers can be synthesized with high enantiomeric purity using the SAMP/RAMP hydrazone method. This process involves starting with simple achiral aldehydes and converting them either to their SAMP or RAMP chiral hydrazones using SAMP or RAMP as a chiral auxiliary. The chiral hydrazones are then metalated with lithium diisopropylamide (LDA) and alkylated with a slight excess of dimethyl sulfate. Testing of the enantiomers by a professional perfumer indicated only a slight difference in odor quality and intensity.

== Applications ==
2-Methylundecanal is used widely as a fragrance element in soaps and detergents as well as in the perfume industry to give conifer notes, fir in particular, but is also used in fantasy compositions. This aldehyde was one of the first synthetics to be used in a prestigious perfume, namely Chanel No. 5.
