= Cinnamonitrile =

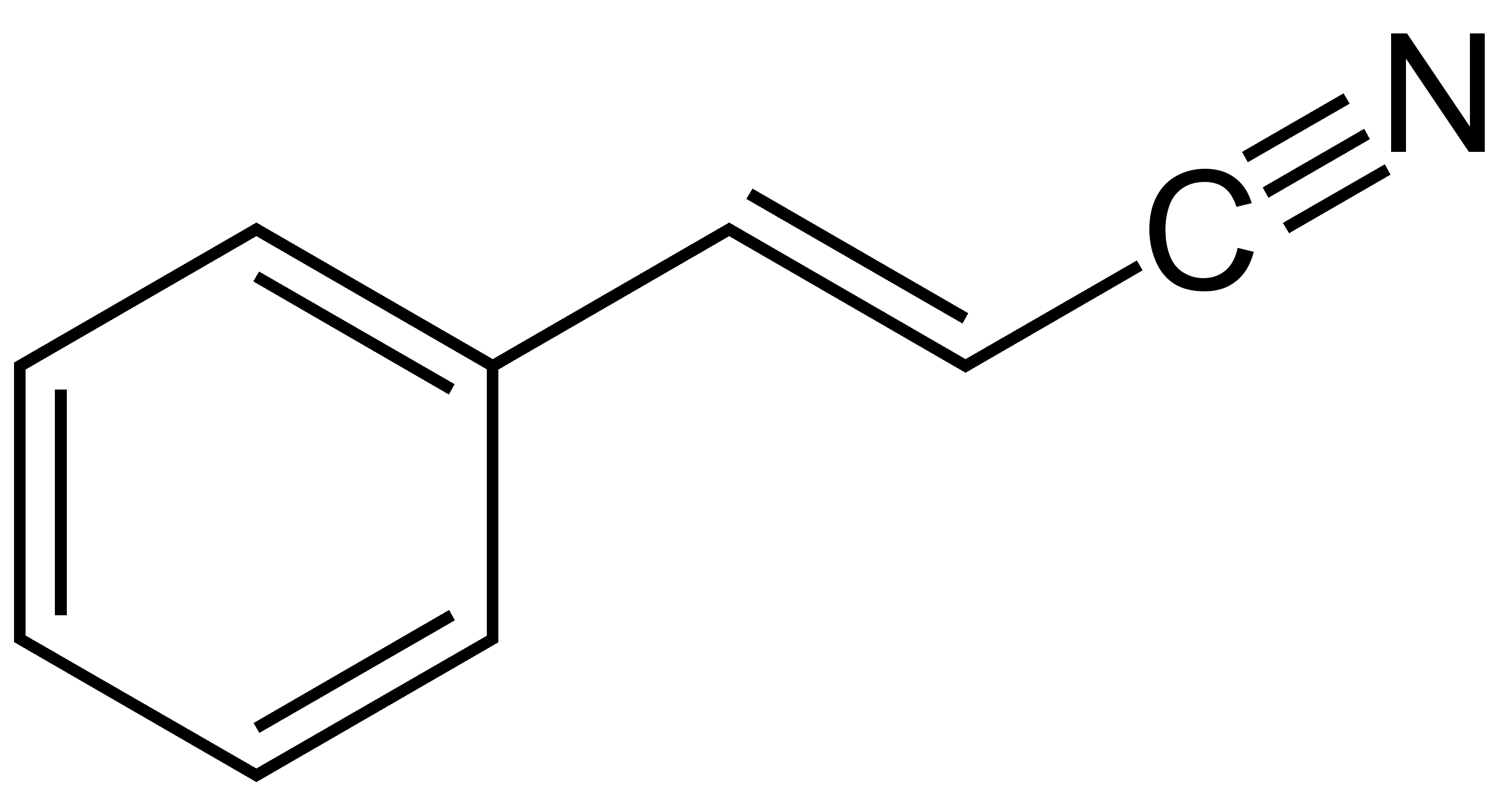

Names
- IUPAC name (E)-3-phenylprop-2-enenitrile
- Other names: trans-Cinnamonitrile; trans-β-Phenylacrylonitrile; (E)-3-Phenyl-2-propenenitrile

Identifiers
CAS Number	1885-38-7; 4360-47-8 (unspecified geometry)
3D model (JSmol)	Interactive image
ChEMBL	ChEMBL2387747
ChemSpider	1267328
ECHA InfoCard	100.015.957
EC Number	217-552-5
PubChem CID	1550846
UNII	H475UV3WWH
CompTox Dashboard (EPA)	DTXSID8044385
- InChI: InChI=1S/C9H7N/c10-8-4-7-9-5-2-1-3-6-9/h1-7H/b7-4+ Key: ZWKNLRXFUTWSOY-QPJJXVBHSA-N
- SMILES: C(=C/C#N)\C1=CC=CC=C1

Properties
Chemical formula	C_{9}H_{7}N
Molar mass	129.162 g·mol^{−1}
Density	1.0374 (15.2 °C)
Melting point	22 °C (72 °F; 295 K)
Boiling point	263.8 °C (506.8 °F; 537.0 K)
log P	1.96

Hazards
- GHS labelling
Pictograms	(GHS06: Toxic) (GHS07: Exclamation mark)
Signal word	Danger
Hazard statements	H301, H312, H317
Precautionary statements	P261, P264, P270, P272, P280, P301+P316, P302+P352, P317, P321, P330, P333+P313, P362+P364, P405, P501
- Except where otherwise noted, data are given for materials in their standard state (at 25 °C [77 °F], 100 kPa). Infobox references

(E)-Cinnamonitrile is an organic compound approved for use as a fragrance in products such as air fresheners. It has a spicy cinnamon/cassia aroma.

Synthetic routes include an aldol-like condensation of benzaldehyde with acetonitrile under alkaline conditions, an elimination reaction of various oxime-esters derived from cinnamaldehyde, and oxidative coupling of benzene to acrylonitrile.
