= Propionaldehyde =

Skeletal formula of propionaldehyde (propanal)
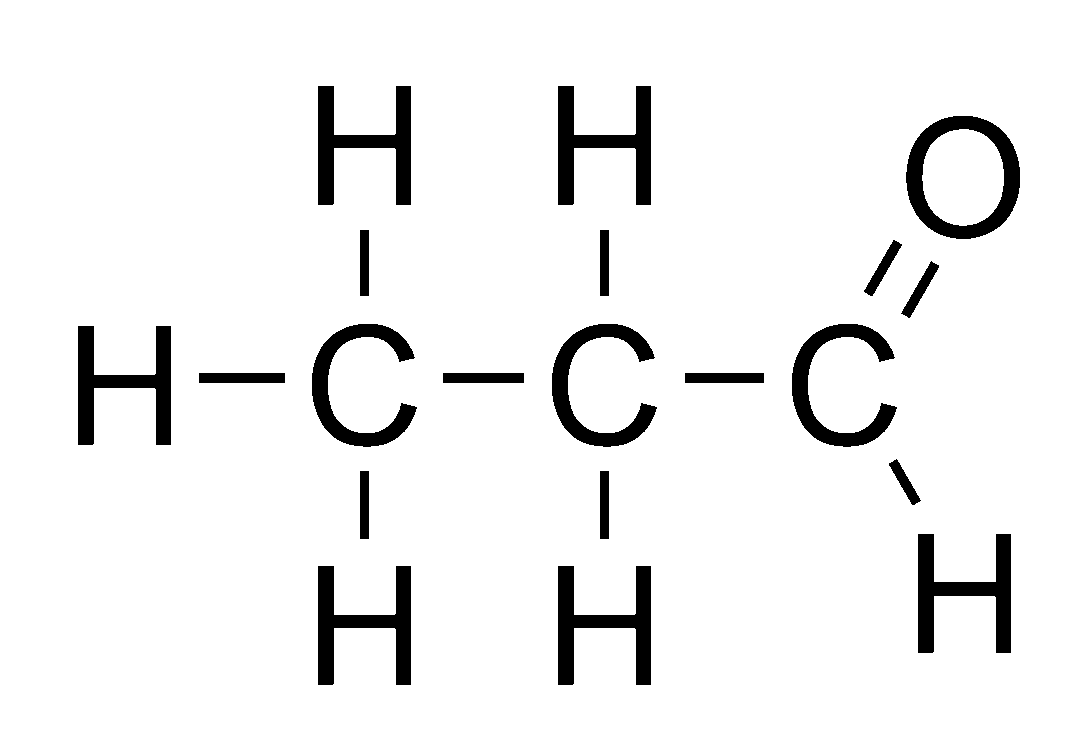
Flat structure
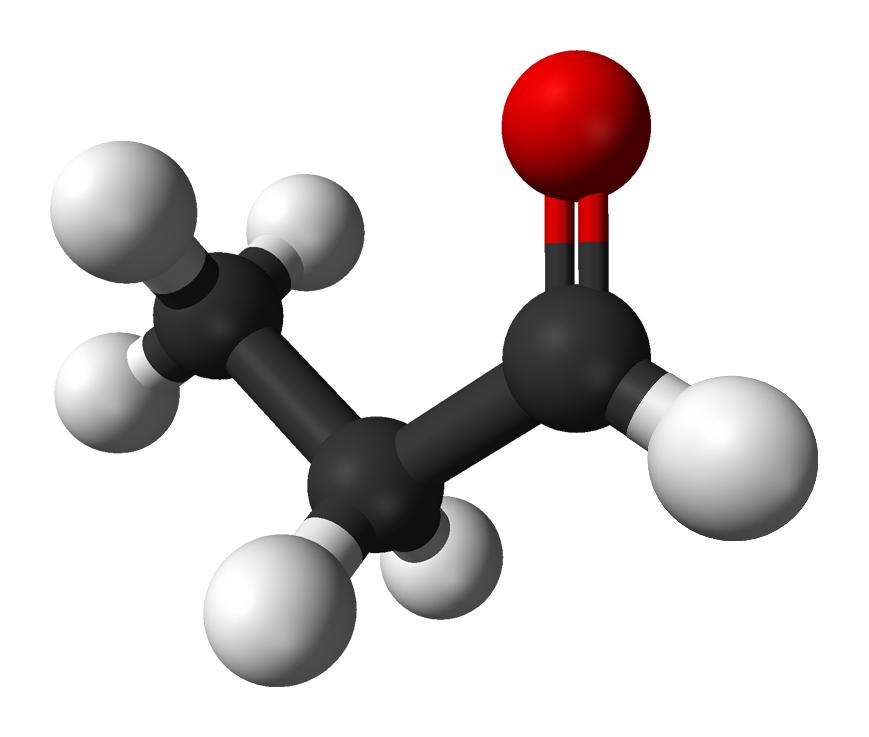
- Ball-and-stick model

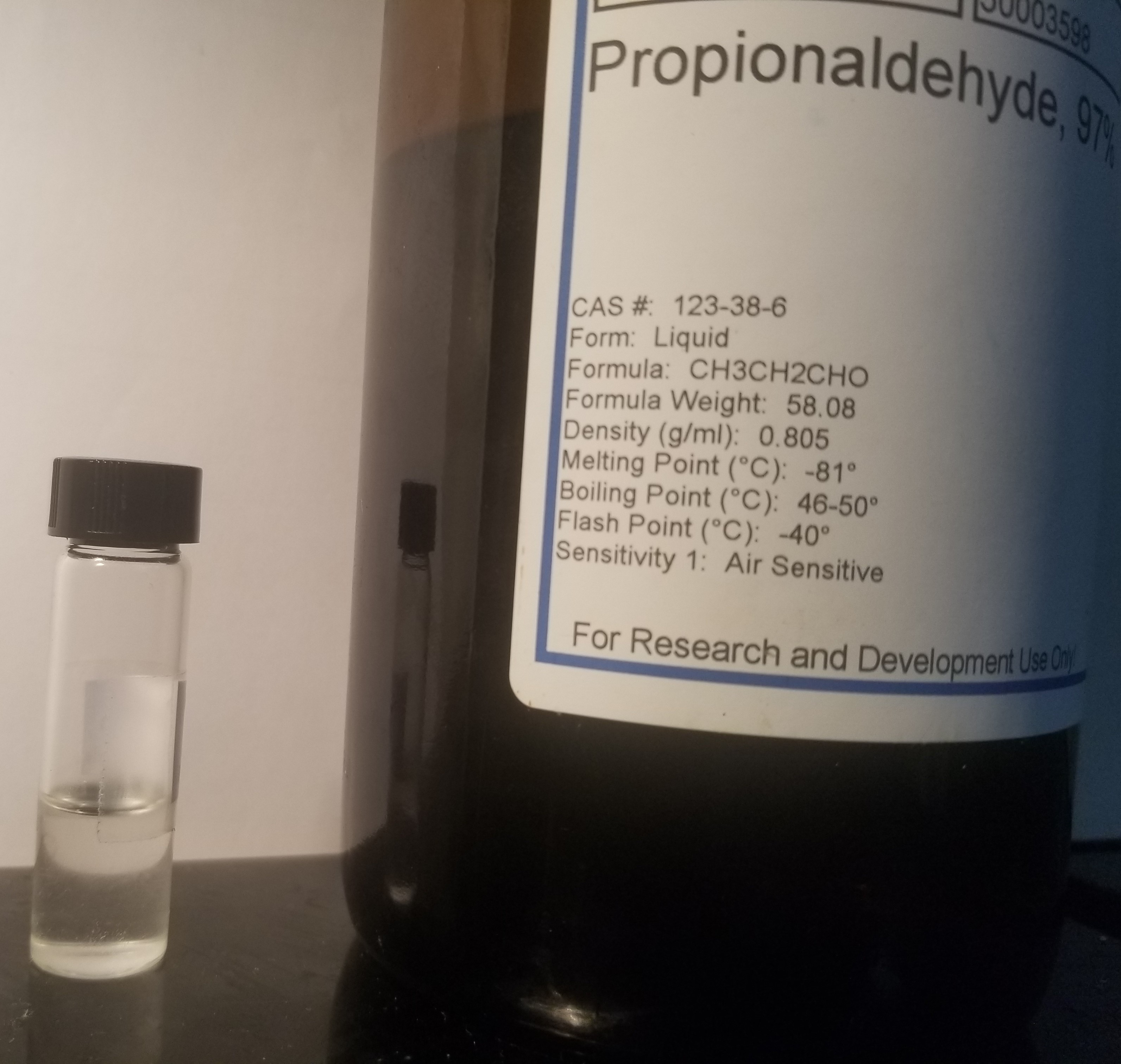

Names
- IUPAC name Propionaldehyde
- Preferred IUPAC name Propanal
- Other names: Methylacetaldehyde; Propionic aldehyde; Propaldehyde; Propan-1-one

Identifiers
CAS Number	123-38-6
3D model (JSmol)	Interactive image
ChEBI	CHEBI:17153
ChEMBL	ChEMBL275626
ChemSpider	512
ECHA InfoCard	100.004.204
EC Number	204-623-0
KEGG	C00479
PubChem CID	527
RTECS number	UE0350000
UNII	AMJ2B4M67V
UN number	1275
CompTox Dashboard (EPA)	DTXSID2021658
- InChI: InChI=1S/C3H6O/c1-2-3-4/h3H,2H2,1H3 Key: NBBJYMSMWIIQGU-UHFFFAOYSA-N
- SMILES: CCC=O

Properties
Chemical formula	C_{3}H_{6}O
Molar mass	58.080 g·mol^{−1}
Appearance	Colourless liquid
Odor	Pungent and fruity
Density	0.81 g cm^{−3}
Melting point	−81 °C (−114 °F; 192 K)
Boiling point	46 to 50 °C (115 to 122 °F; 319 to 323 K)
Solubility in water	20 g/100 mL
Magnetic susceptibility (χ)	−34.32·10^{−6} cm^{3}/mol
Viscosity	0.6 cP at 20 °C

Structure
Molecular shape	C_{1}, O: sp^{2} C_{2}, C_{3}: sp^{3}
Dipole moment	2.52 D

Hazards
- GHS labelling
Pictograms	(GHS02: Flammable) (GHS05: Corrosive) (GHS07: Exclamation mark)
Signal word	Danger
Hazard statements	H225, H302, H315, H318, H332, H335
Precautionary statements	P210, P261, P280, P304+P340+P312, P305+P351+P338, P310, P403+P235
NFPA 704 (fire diamond)	2 3 2
Flash point	−26 °C (−15 °F; 247 K)
Autoignition temperature	175 °C (347 °F; 448 K)

Related compounds
Related aldehydes	Acetaldehyde; Butyraldehyde
- Except where otherwise noted, data are given for materials in their standard state (at 25 °C [77 °F], 100 kPa). verify (what is ?) Infobox references

Propionaldehyde or propanal is the organic compound with the formula CH_{3}CH_{2}CHO. It is the 3-carbon aldehyde. It is a colourless, flammable liquid with a pungent and fruity odour. It is produced on a large scale industrially.

== Production ==
Propionaldehyde is mainly produced industrially by hydroformylation of ethylene:

CO + H_{2} + C_{2}H_{4} → CH_{3}CH_{2}CHO

In this way, several hundred thousand tons are produced annually.

=== Laboratory preparation ===
Propionaldehyde may also be prepared by oxidizing 1-propanol with a mixture of sulfuric acid and potassium dichromate. The reflux condenser contains water heated at 60 °C, which condenses unreacted propanol, but allows propionaldehyde to pass. The propionaldehyde vapor is immediately condensed into a suitable receiver. In this arrangement, any propionaldehyde formed is immediately removed from the reactor, thus it does not get over-oxidized to propionic acid.

== Reactions ==
Propionaldehyde exhibits the reactions characteristic of alkyl aldehydes, e.g. hydrogenation, aldol condensations, oxidations, etc. It is the simplest aldehyde with a prochiral methylene such that α-functionalized derivatives (CH_{3}CH(X)CHO) are chiral. If water is available, propionaldehyde exists in equilibrium with 1,1-propanediol, a geminal diol.

2-Methylpentanal (CH_{3}CH_{2}CH_{2}CH(CH_{3})CHO) arises by aldol condensation of propionaldehyde followed by dehydration and hydrogenation.

== Uses ==
Both industrially and in the laboratory, propionaldehyde has primary application as a chemical building block.

It is predominantly used as a precursor to trimethylolethane (CH_{3}C(CH_{2}OH)_{3}) through a condensation reaction with formaldehyde. This triol is an important intermediate in the production of alkyd resins. It is used in the synthesis of several common aroma compounds (cyclamen aldehyde, helional, lilial).

Reduction of propionaldehyde gives n‑propanol, and reductive amination gives propanamine. Rising demand for non-chlorocarbon solvents has caused some manufacturers to substitutively brominate n‑propanol to propyl bromide. However, the majority of applications use n‑propanol proper in esters or glycol ethers, or as a gentle alkylant for primary and secondary amines.

Oxidants instead give propionic acid and propionates, typically used as preservatives.

=== Laboratory uses ===
Many laboratory uses exploit its participation in condensation reactions. With tert-butylamine it gives CH_{3}CH_{2}CH=N-t-Bu, a three-carbon building block used in organic synthesis.

== Extraterrestrial occurrence ==
Propionaldehyde along with acrolein has been detected in the molecular cloud Sagittarius B2 near the center of the Milky Way Galaxy, about 26,000 light years from Earth.

Measurements by the COSAC and Ptolemy instruments on comet 67/P's surface, revealed sixteen organic compounds, four of which were seen for the first time on a comet, including acetamide, acetone, methyl isocyanate and propionaldehyde.

== Safety ==
With an LD_{50} of 1690 mg/kg (oral), propionaldehyde exhibits low acute toxicity, but is a lung and eye irritant and is a combustible liquid.
