= Lilial =

Names
- IUPAC name 3-(4-tert-Butylphenyl)-2-methylpropanal
- Other names: 4-tert-Butyl-α-methyl-benzenepropanal; 4-tert-Butyl-α-methyl-hydrocinnamaldehyde; Butylphenyl methylpropional, BMHCA, p-BMHCA

Identifiers
CAS Number	80-54-6 (Racemic); 75166-31-3 (2R); 75166-30-2 (2S)
3D model (JSmol)	Interactive image
ChemSpider	1266494 (2R); 1363748 (2S); 199342
ECHA InfoCard	100.001.173
EC Number	201-289-8
PubChem CID	1549660 (2R); 1715213 (2S); 228987
RTECS number	MW4895000
UNII	T7540GJV69 (Racemic); 14X71K3AMT (2R); WP1PPC4R9G (2S)
UN number	3082
CompTox Dashboard (EPA)	DTXSID9026500
- InChI: InChI=1S/C14H20O/c1-11(10-15)9-12-5-7-13(8-6-12)14(2,3)4/h5-8,10-11H,9H2,1-4H3 Key: SDQFDHOLCGWZPU-UHFFFAOYSA-N
- SMILES: CC(CC1=CC=C(C=C1)C(C)(C)C)C=O

Properties
Chemical formula	C_{14}H_{20}O
Molar mass	204.313 g·mol^{−1}
Appearance	Clear viscous liquid
Density	0.94 g/cm^{3}
Melting point	−20 °C (−4 °F; 253 K)
Boiling point	275 °C (527 °F; 548 K)
Solubility in water	0.045 g/L at 20 °C
log P	4.36

Pharmacology
Routes of administration	Topical

Related compounds
Related aldehydes	Bourgeonal Isobutyraldehyde; Hexyl cinnamaldehyde 2-Methylundecanal
- Except where otherwise noted, data are given for materials in their standard state (at 25 °C [77 °F], 100 kPa). Infobox references

Lilial (a trade name for lily aldehyde, also known as lysmeral or lilestralis) is an organic compound with the formula (CH_{3})_{3}CC_{6}H_{4}CH_{2}CH(CH_{3})CHO. It is an aromatic aldehyde, naturally occurring in crow-dipper and tomato plants. It was once produced synthetically in a multi-ton scale for use as a perfume in cosmetic preparations and laundry powders, often under the name butylphenyl methylpropional. It has been largely banned after being found to be harmful to fertility.

It is also used as an intermediate in the synthesis of agrochemicals such as fenpropimorph and fenpropidin.

== Synthesis ==
Lilial is produced by the mixed aldol coupling of 4-tert-butylbenzaldehyde (typically as it's methanol acetal) and propionaldehyde, followed by hydrogenation.

== Properties ==
Lilial is commonly produced and sold as a racemic mixture; however, testing has indicated that the different enantiomers of the compound do not contribute equally to its odor. The (R)-enantiomer has a strong floral odor, reminiscent of cyclamen or lily of the valley; whereas the (S)-enantiomer possesses no strong odor.

Like most aldehydes, lilial tends to oxidize on storage.

== Safety ==
The Scientific Committee on Consumer Safety (SCCS, scientific committee for consumer safety of the EU Commission) concluded in May 2019 that the use of lilial in both rinse-off and leave-on cosmetics "cannot be considered as safe". The toxicity of Lilial is attributed to its degradation product tert-butylbenzoic acid.

After animal studies found it to be toxic for reproduction, it was reclassified as a prohibited substance in the EU, and banned from use in cosmetics as of March 2022.

It can sometimes act as an allergen and may cause contact dermatitis in susceptible individuals. Lilial was used in many perfumes (examples: Byredo Inflorescence, Salvador Dali Laguna, Elizabeth Arden 5th Avenue, etc.) produced before 2022 as a synthetic substitute for the scent of lily of the valley. Due to the ban on the use of Lilial, safe analogues are currently used in perfume production.

== See also ==
- Helional
- Bourgeonal
