= Cyclamen aldehyde =

Names
- IUPAC name 3-(4-Isopropylphenyl)-2-methylpropanal
- Other names Cyclamal; 2-Methyl-3-(p-isopropylphenyl)propionaldehyde; 3-(4-Isopropylphenyl)-2-methylpropanal; alpha-Methyl-p-isopropylcinnamaldehyde

Identifiers
CAS Number	103-95-7
3D model (JSmol)	Interactive image
ChEMBL	ChEMBL3183483
ChemSpider	451801
ECHA InfoCard	100.002.874
EC Number	203-161-7
PubChem CID	517827
UNII	4U37UX0E1E
CompTox Dashboard (EPA)	DTXSID2044769
- InChI: InChI=1S/C13H18O/c1-10(2)13-6-4-12(5-7-13)8-11(3)9-14/h4-7,9-11H,8H2,1-3H3 Key: ZFNVDHOSLNRHNN-UHFFFAOYSA-N
- SMILES: CC(C)c1ccc(cc1)CC(C)C=O

Properties
Chemical formula	C_{13}H_{18}O
Molar mass	190.286 g·mol^{−1}
Appearance	Colorless liquid
Odor	Strong floral aroma
Density	0.95 g/mL
Boiling point	270 °C (518 °F; 543 K)
Solubility in water	Insoluble
Solubility in other solvents	Soluble in most fixed oils, ethanol; Insoluble in propylene glycol, glycerin

Hazards
Flash point	109 °C (228 °F; 382 K)
- Except where otherwise noted, data are given for materials in their standard state (at 25 °C [77 °F], 100 kPa). Infobox references

Cyclamen aldehyde is an organic compound with the formula (CH_{3})_{2}CHC_{6}H_{4}CH_{2}CH(CH_{3})CHO. It is a chiral compound although it is most commonly used as the racemate. It is a component of fragrances described as "floral, cyclamen, fresh, rhubarb, musty, green". It has been used in soaps, detergents, lotions, and perfumes since the 1920s. It was granted generally recognized as safe (GRAS) status by the Flavor and Extract Manufacturers Association (FEMA) in 1965 and is approved by the Food and Drug Administration for food use in the United States. The Council of Europe (1970) included cyclamen aldehyde in the list of admissible artificial flavoring substances, at a level of 1 ppm. It is a colorless compound, although commercial samples can appear yellowish..

== Synthesis ==
Cyclamen aldehyde is not naturally occurring and is prepared by the crossed-aldol condensation of cuminaldehyde and propionaldehyde followed by catalytic hydrogenation. Other routes have been reported..
