= C7H14O =

The molecular formula C_{7}H_{14}O (molar mass: 114.18 g/mol) may refer to:

- Cyclohexylmethanol
- Cycloheptanol
- 1-Methylcyclohexanol
- Heptanal, or heptanaldehyde
- Heptanones
  - 2-Heptanone
  - 3-Heptanone
  - 4-Heptanone
- 5-Methyl-2-hexanone
