= 2014 =

2014 in various calendars
- Gregorian calendar: 2014; MMXIV
- Ab urbe condita: 2767
- Armenian calendar: 1463; ԹՎ ՌՆԿԳ
- Assyrian calendar: 6764
- Baháʼí calendar: 170–171
- Balinese saka calendar: 1935–1936
- Bengali calendar: 1420–1421
- Berber calendar: 2964
- British Regnal year: 62 Eliz. 2 – 63 Eliz. 2
- Buddhist calendar: 2558
- Burmese calendar: 1376
- Byzantine calendar: 7522–7523
- Chinese calendar: 癸巳年 (Water Snake); 4711 or 4504 — to — 甲午年 (Wood Horse); 4712 or 4505
- Coptic calendar: 1730–1731
- Discordian calendar: 3180
- Ethiopian calendar: 2006–2007
- Hebrew calendar: 5774–5775
- Hindu calendars
- Vikram Samvat: 2070–2071
- Shaka Samvat: 1935–1936
- Kali Yuga: 5114–5115
- Holocene calendar: 12014
- Igbo calendar: 1014–1015
- Iranian calendar: 1392–1393
- Islamic calendar: 1435–1436
- Japanese calendar: Heisei 26 (平成２６年)
- Javanese calendar: 1947–1948
- Juche calendar: 103
- Julian calendar: Gregorian minus 13 days
- Korean calendar: 4347
- Minguo calendar: ROC 103 民國103年
- Nanakshahi calendar: 546
- Thai solar calendar: 2557
- Tibetan calendar: ཆུ་མོ་སྦྲུལ་ལོ་ (female Water-Snake); 2140 or 1759 or 987 — to — ཤིང་ཕོ་རྟ་ལོ་ (male Wood-Horse); 2141 or 1760 or 988
- Unix time: 1388534400 – 1420070399

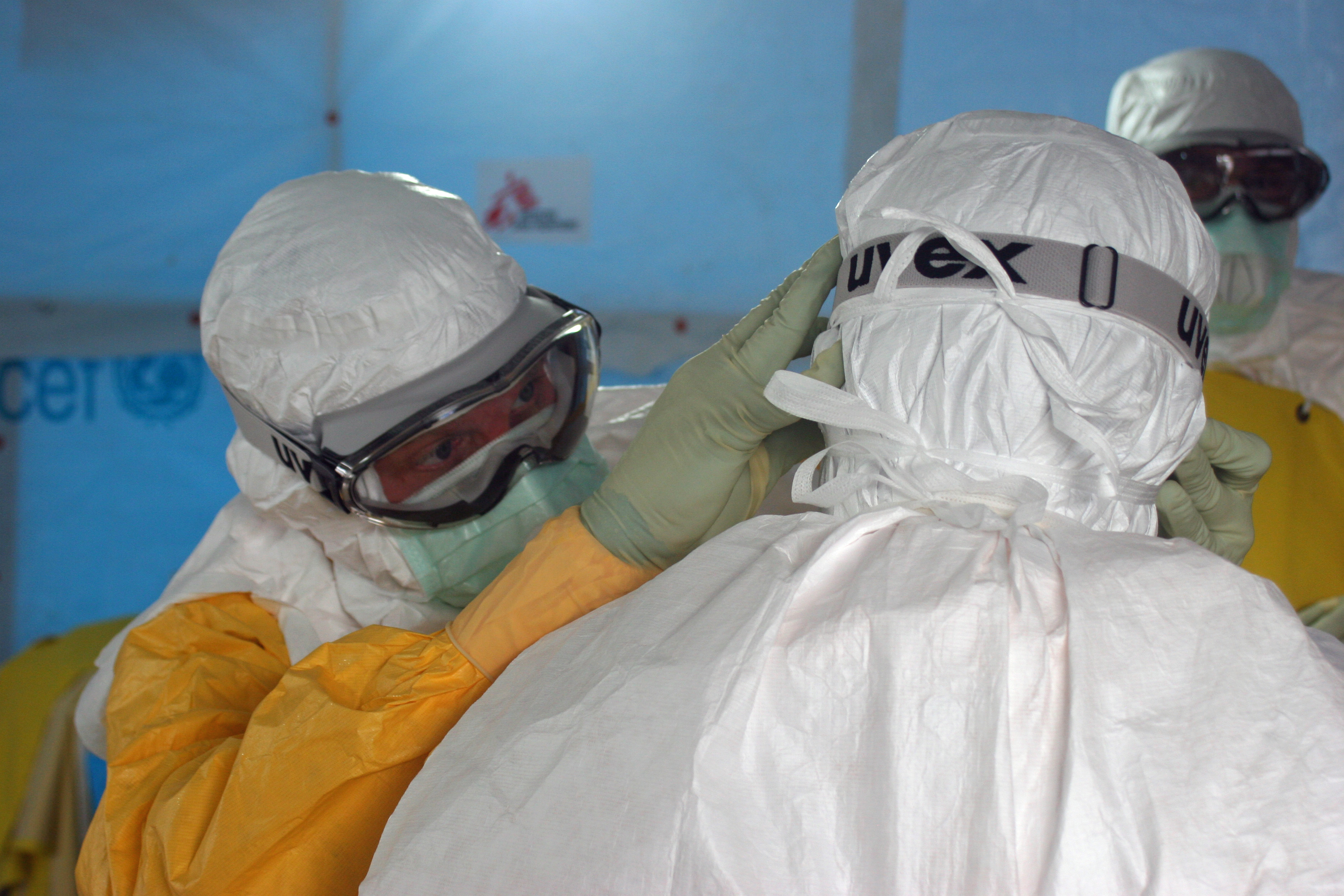
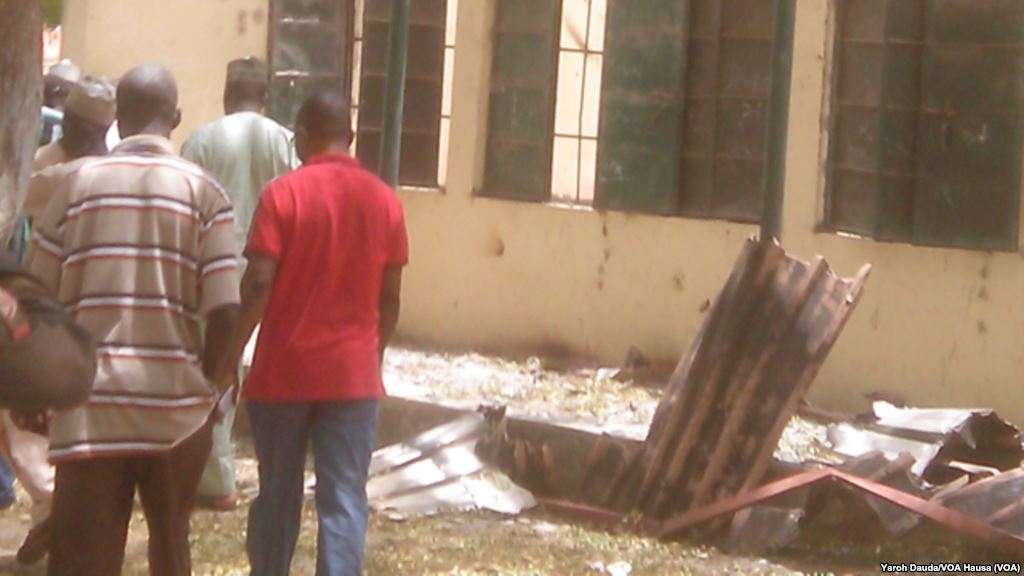
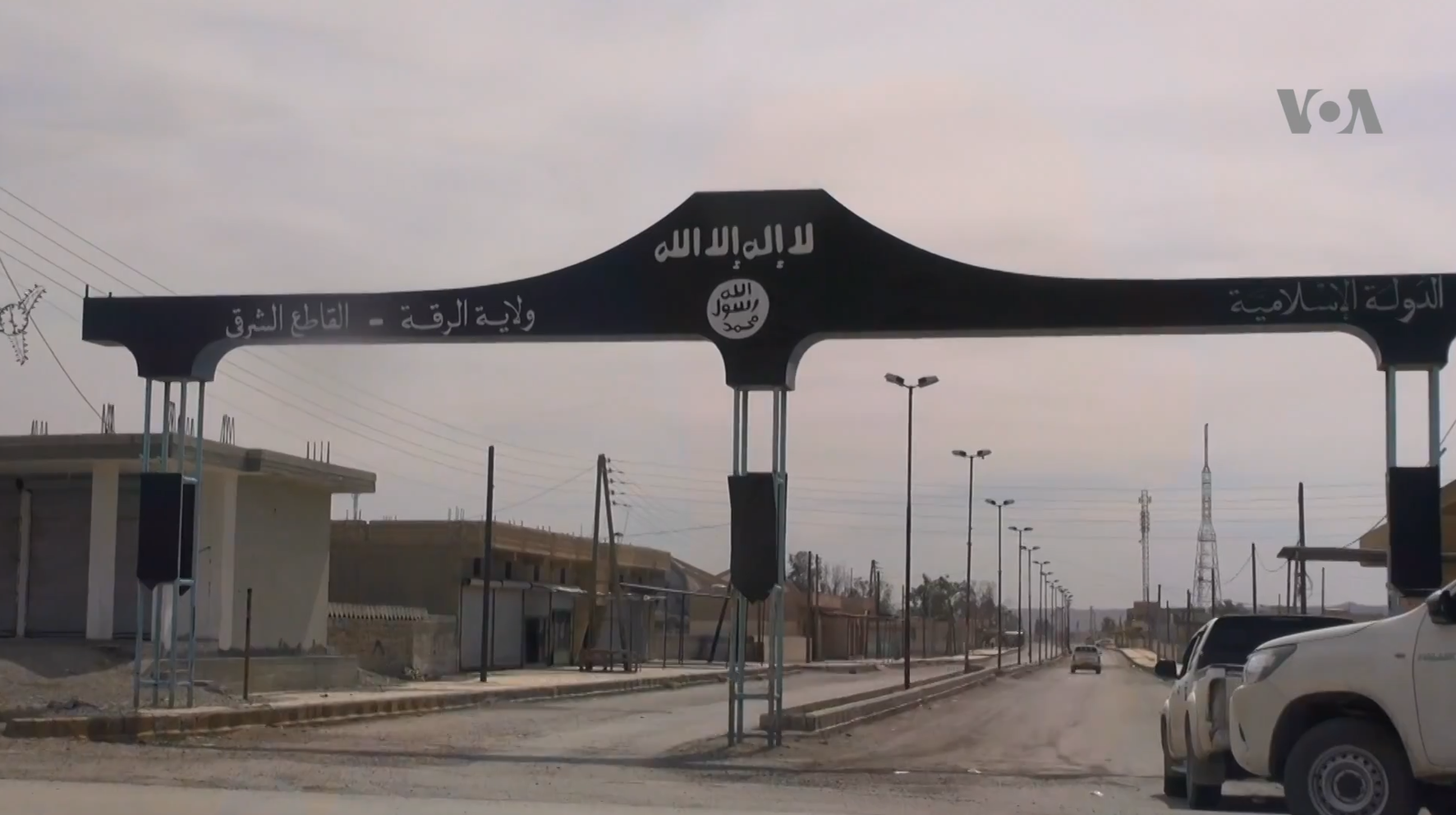
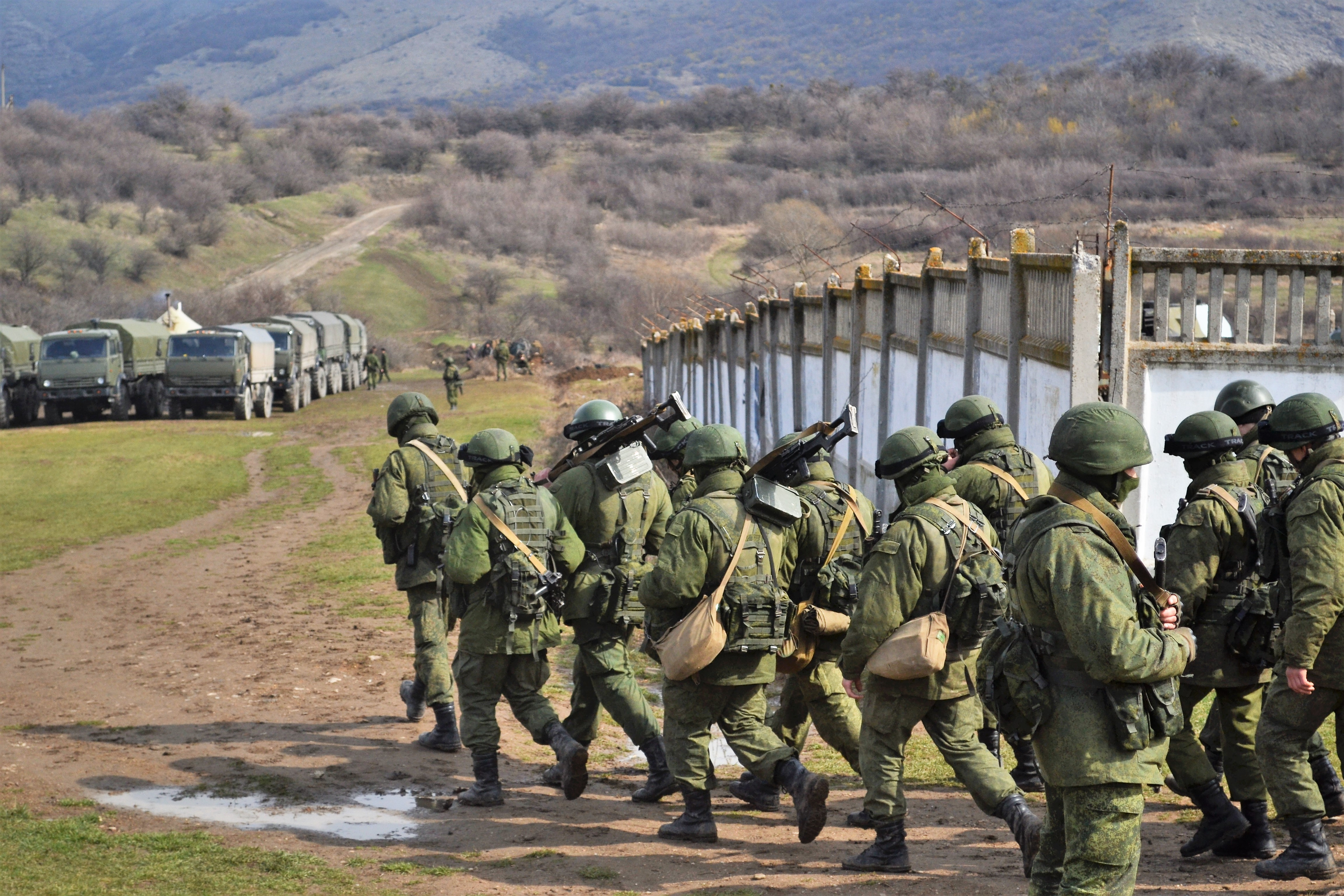
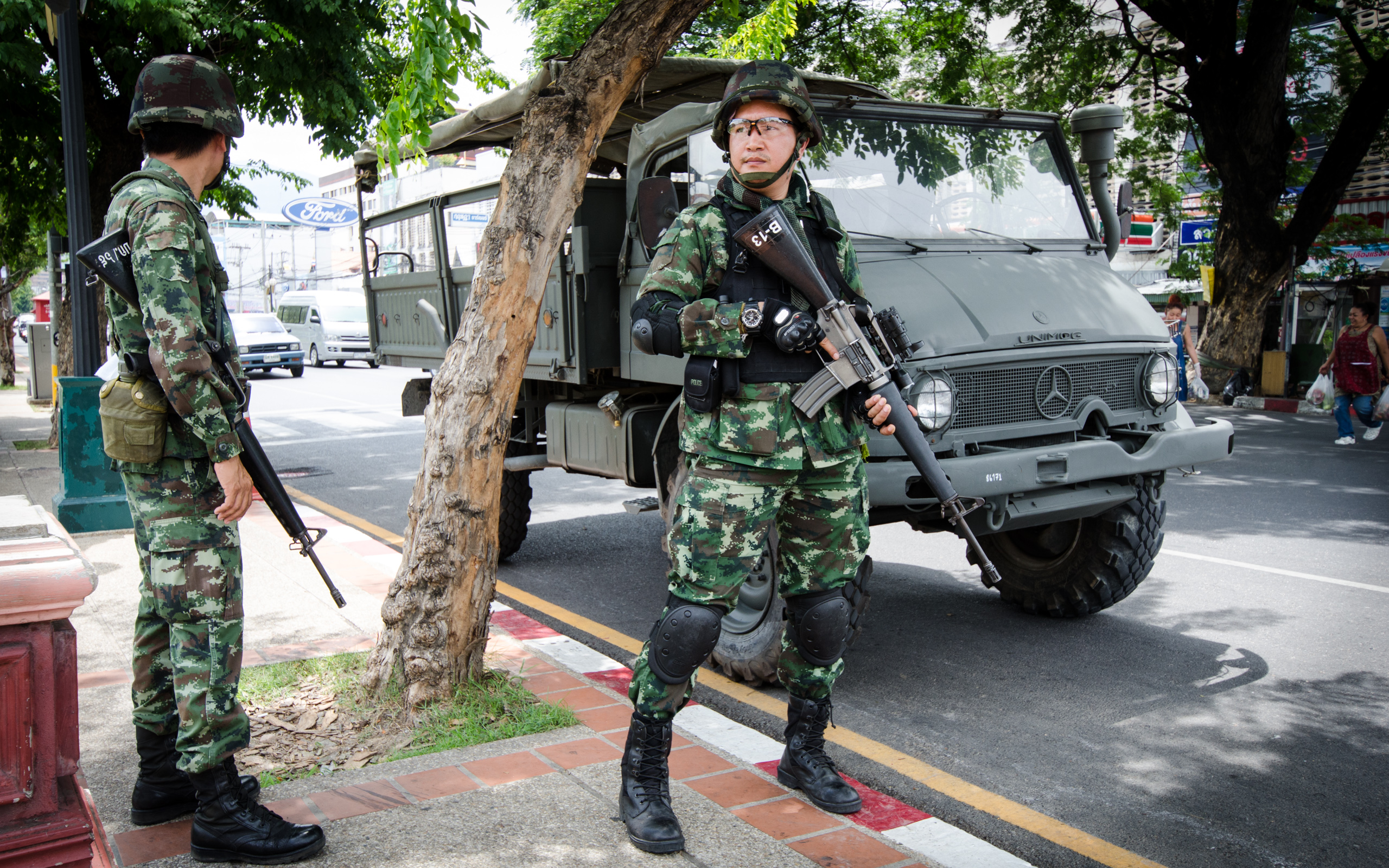
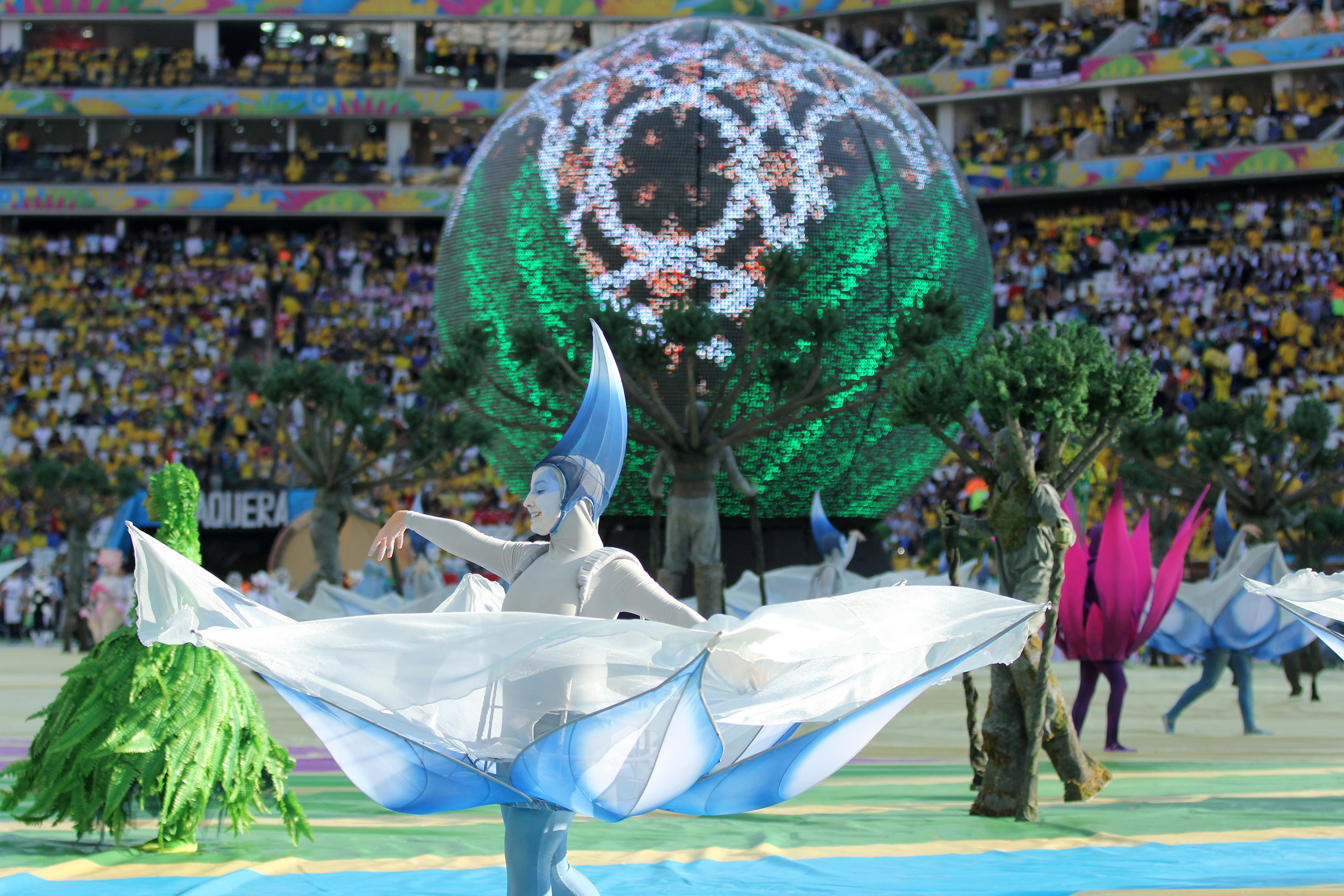
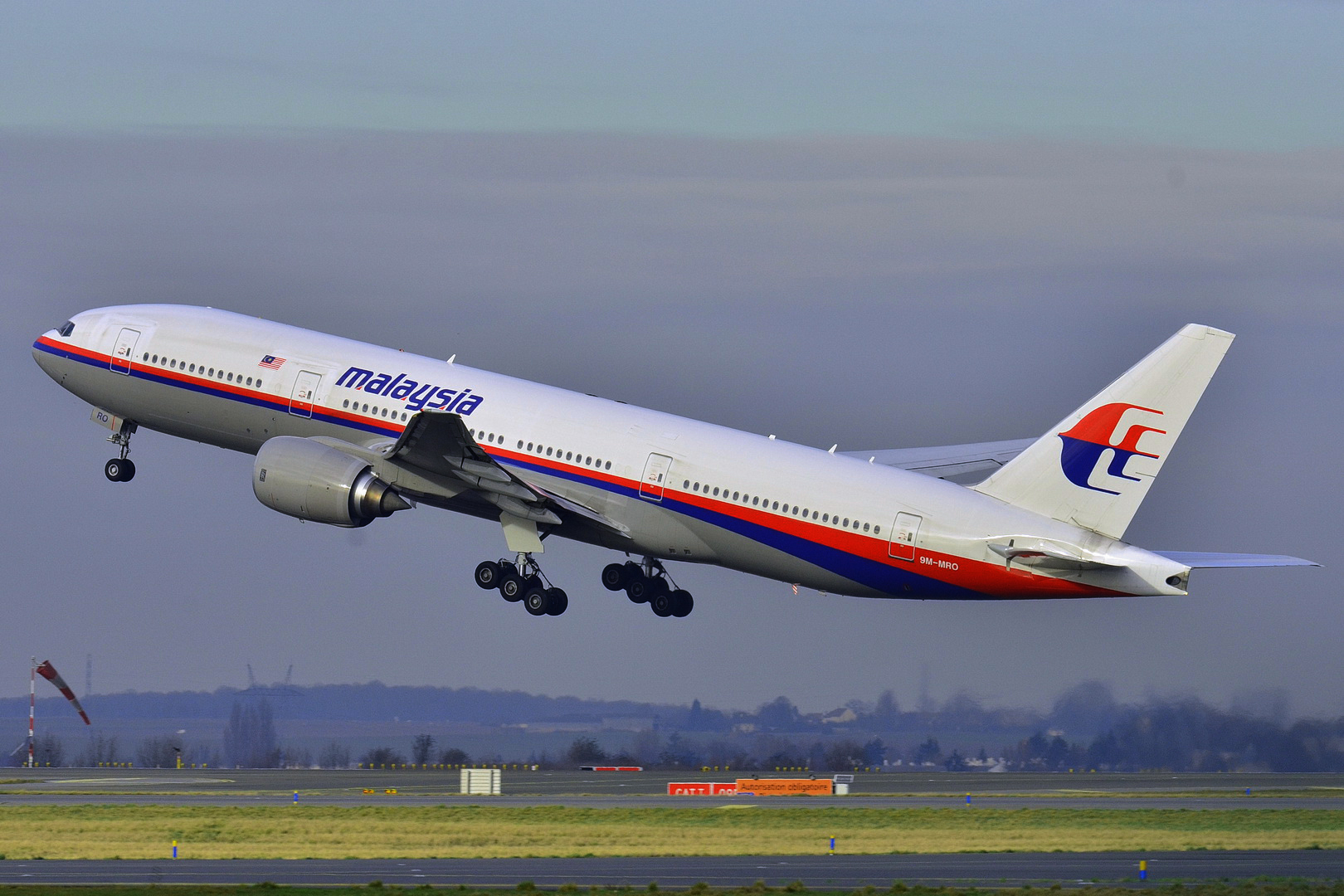
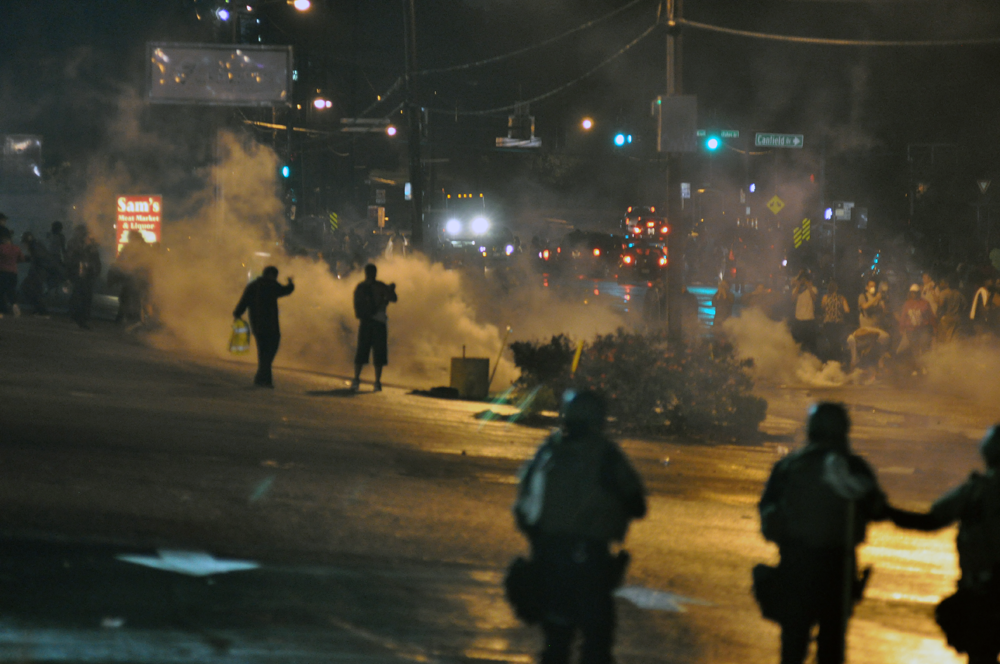
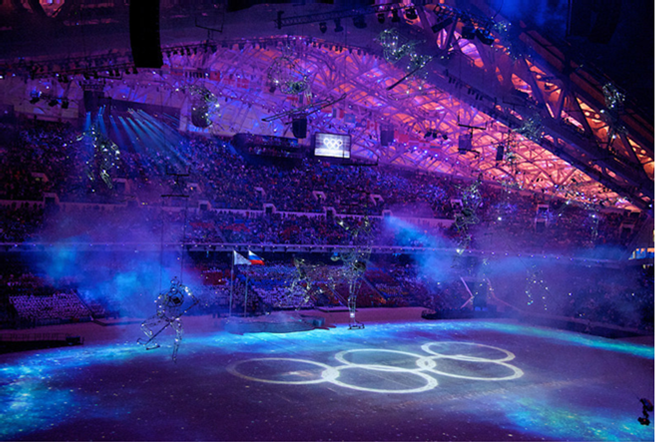
From left to right, top to bottom:
- Healthcare workers helping a colleague put on personal protective equipment (PPE) for the Western African Ebola virus epidemic;
- Citizens examining the ruins after the Chibok schoolgirls kidnapping, where 276 children were abducted by Boko Haram;
- The Islamic State declares itself a caliphate and begins perpetrating global terror attacks;
- Crimea is annexed by Russia, starting the Russo-Ukrainian war;
- Thai soldiers at the Chang Phueak Gate during the Thai coup d'état;
- The 2014 FIFA World Cup is held in Brazil and is won by Germany;
- Malaysia Airlines Flight 370 disappears from the radar and presumed crashed in the southern Indian Ocean;
- The killing of Michael Brown triggers the Ferguson unrest in Ferguson, MO, causing debates about police force in the U.S. globally;
- The 2014 Winter Olympics are held in Sochi, Russia.

2014 (MMXIV) was a common year starting on Wednesday of the Gregorian calendar, the 2014th year of the Common Era (CE) and Anno Domini (AD) designations, the 14th year of the 3rd millennium and the 21st century, and the 5th year of the 2010s decade.

The year 2014 was marked by the surge of the West African Ebola epidemic, which began in 2013, becoming the most widespread outbreak of the Ebola virus in human history, resulting in 28,646 confirmed infections and 11,323 confirmed deaths according to the World Health Organization, who declared it a Public Health Emergency in August. The virus caused major socioeconomic disruption in the region, primarily in Guinea, Liberia and Sierra Leone. Other notable health concerns in 2014 included a significant increase in polio cases in Pakistan.

The rise of ISIS became a major geopolitical crisis in 2014 after the group declared a global caliphate and launched devastating offensives in Iraq and Syria. The Camp Speicher massacre in which the Islamic State murdered 1,566 Shia Iraqi Air Force cadets and the Fall of Mosul, Iraq's second-largest city, prompted a U.S.-led military intervention, which would later become a global effort. The Islamic State committed numerous atrocities, including mass beheadings, mass executions of civilians, and the genocide and persecution of religious minorities like the Yazidis, Christians and Shia Muslims. ISIS would attract thousands of foreign fighters from across the world to join their military, drawn by their ideology and promises of establishing a global Islamic state. ISIS led to a massive displacement of people in Iraq and Syria, creating a major humanitarian crisis for millions of peoples. Another notable conflict was the 2014 Gaza War, which Israel began 26 days after three Israeli teenagers were murdered in the West Bank by Hamas-affiliated Palestinian militants, the large-scale military operation, codenamed "Operation Protective Edge" saw intense fighting, with Israeli airstrikes and ground incursions into Gaza, killing 2,310 and wounding 10,626 Palestinians. The conflict would end on August 26, 2014, after a ceasefire agreement brokered by Egypt went into effect.

The Euromaidan protests, a series of demonstrations in Ukraine, were triggered by President Viktor Yanukovych's sudden decision to pursue closer economic ties with Russia and his refusal to sign the European Union–Ukraine Association Agreement, which culminated in the Revolution of Dignity in February. Following this, a disputed referendum led to Russia occupying and annexing Crimea from Ukraine, subsequent pro-Russian unrest led to Russian backed separatist forces in eastern Ukraine seizing control of key areas, leading to the War in Donbas in April. The war escalated after Malaysia Airlines Flight MH17 was shot down by Russian-backed forces while flying in Eastern Ukraine.

Political crises continued across the globe, with Thailand experiencing a military coup in May as the Royal Thai Army overthrew the caretaker government. Civil wars started in Libya and Yemen. Three main airplane disasters happened, the mysterious disappearance of Malaysia Airlines Flight 370, the shooting down of Malaysia Airlines Flight 17 over eastern Ukraine, and the crash of Indonesia AirAsia Flight 8501, collectively claiming over 700 lives. Civil unrest emerged in Ferguson, Missouri in the United States due to the killing of Michael Brown and in Hong Kong, during the 2014 Hong Kong protests. Despite all these challenges, scientific achievement provided hope as India became the first Asian nation to reach Mars with its Mangalyaan mission, and the Rosetta spacecraft's Philae probe completed humanity's first landing on a comet.

2014 was designated as:

- International Year of Crystallography
- International Year of Family Farming
- International Year of Small Island Developing States
- International Year of Solidarity with the Palestinian People

== Events ==
=== January ===
- January 1 – Latvia adopts the euro as its currency and becomes the 18th member of the Eurozone.
- January 5 – A launch of the communication satellite GSAT-14 aboard the GSLV Mk.II D5 marks the first successful flight of an Indian cryogenic rocket engine.
- January 9 – The Elk River Chemical Spill in Charleston, West Virginia, when a leakage of the chemical MCMH from a Freedom Industries chemical plant left 300,000 residents of Charleston and nine surrounding counties without drinkable water for over three months.

=== February ===
- February – Guen massacre: in the context of the civil war in Central African Republic, Anti-balaka militia murdered 72 Muslim civilians.
- February – The West African Ebola virus epidemic begins, infecting at least 28,616 people and killing at least 11,310 people, the most severe both in terms of numbers of infections and casualties.
- February 7–23 – The XXII Olympic Winter Games are held in Sochi, Russia. Slopestyle events are introduced for the first time.
- February 13 – Belgium becomes the first country in the world to legalise euthanasia for terminally ill patients of any age.
- February 22 – Revolution of Dignity: The Verkhovna Rada (Ukrainian parliament) votes to remove President Viktor Yanukovych from office, replacing him with Oleksandr Turchynov, after days of civil unrest leaving around 100 people dead in Kyiv.
- February 24 – The McDonnell Douglas DC-10 operates its last passenger flight, signaling the end to a bygone era of aviation.
- February 28 – The number of people in the U.S. using mobile devices to access the internet overtook those using desktop computers for the first time, a feat which would be followed globally two years later in 2016.

=== March ===
- March 1 – 2014 Kunming attack: Eight knife-wielding terrorists stabbed and slashed passengers at the Kunming railway station in Kunming, Yunnan, China, killing 31 people and injuring 143 others.
- March 5 – Nicolás Maduro, the President of Venezuela, severs diplomatic and political ties with Panama, accusing Panama of being involved in a conspiracy against the Venezuelan government.
- March 8 – Malaysia Airlines Flight 370, a Boeing 777 airliner en route to Beijing from Kuala Lumpur, disappears over the Gulf of Thailand with 239 people on board. The aircraft is presumed to have crashed into the Indian Ocean.
- March 16
  - 2014 Crimean status referendum: A disputed referendum on the status of the Crimean Peninsula is held.
  - The fifth ICC T20 World Cup in cricket is held in Bangladesh.
- March 21 – Russia formally annexes Crimea after President Vladimir Putin signs a bill formalizing the process.
- March 24 – During an emergency meeting, the United Kingdom, the United States, Italy, Germany, France, Japan, and Canada temporarily suspend Russia from the G8, recognizing Crimea within Ukraine's international borders and rejecting the validity of the 2014 Crimean referendum.
- March 31 – The United Nations International Court of Justice rules that Japan's Antarctic whaling program is not scientific but commercial and forbids grants of further permits.

=== April ===
- April 7 – The self-proclaimed Donetsk People's Republic declares its independence from Ukraine.
- April 10 – In response to the invasion and subsequent annexation of Crimea by Russia, the Parliamentary Assembly of the Council of Europe (PACE) passes a resolution to temporarily strip Russia of its voting rights; its rights to be represented in the Bureau of the Assembly, the PACE Presidential Committee, and the PACE Standing Committee; and its right to participate in election-observation missions.
- April 14 – Chibok schoolgirls kidnapping: an estimated 276 girls and women are abducted from a school in Nigeria and held hostage.
- April 16 – The South Korean ferry MV Sewol capsizes and sinks after an unmanageable cargo shift, killing 304 people, mostly high school students.
- April 27 – The Catholic Church simultaneously canonizes Popes John XXIII and John Paul II.
- April 28 – United States President Barack Obama's new economic sanctions against Russia go into effect, targeting companies and individuals close to Russian President Vladimir Putin.

=== May ===
- May 2
  - 2014 Odesa clashes
- May 5
  - The World Health Organization identifies the spread of poliomyelitis in at least 10 countries as a major worldwide health emergency.
  - Boko Haram militants kill approximately 300 people in a night attack on Gamboru Ngala in Nigeria.
- May 6–10 – The Eurovision Song Contest 2014 takes place in Copenhagen, Denmark, and is won by Austrian entrant Conchita Wurst with the song "Rise Like a Phoenix".
- May 12 – The self-proclaimed Luhansk People's Republic declares its independence from Ukraine.
- May 14 – According to a South Korea Unification Ministry report, a twenty-three story apartment building collapsed in Pyongchon-guyok, Pyongyang, North Korea (DPR of Korea), with more than 490 fatalities estimated.
- May 16 – The Battle of Benghazi leads to the start of the Second Libyan Civil War.
- May 20 – 2014 Jos bombings: Terrorists in Nigeria detonate bombs at Jos, killing 118 people.
- May 21 – A mass stabbing incident occurred on Taipei Metro's Bannan line from Longshan Temple to Jiangzicui station causing 4 fatalities and 21 injuries.
- May 22
  - 2014 Thai coup d'état: The Royal Thai Army overthrows the caretaker government of Niwatthamrong Boonsongpaisan after a failure to resolve the political unrest in Thailand.
  - A terrorist attack in Ürümqi, China leaves 43 people dead and more than 90 injured.
  - The Donetsk People's Republic and the Luhansk People's Republic declare the formation of Novorossiya, also referred to as the Union of People's Republics.
- May 23 – Isla Vista attacks: Elliot Rodger kills 6 people and injures 14 more before committing suicide in his car in Isla Vista, California, United States in an incel terrorist attack.
- May 26 – Narendra Modi succeeds Manmohan Singh as the 14th Prime Minister of India.
- May 28 - The Jangseong Nursing Home fire happens in Jangseong County, South Korea killing 21.

=== June ===
- June 5 – A Sunni militant group now calling itself the Islamic State of Iraq and the Levant (also known as ISIS, ISIL or Daesh) begins an offensive through northern Iraq, aiming to capture the Iraqi capital city of Baghdad and overthrow the Shiite government led by Prime Minister Nouri al-Maliki.
- June 12
  - In the Camp Speicher massacre in Iraq, ISIL kills 1,566 Shia Iraqi Air Force cadets. It is the second deadliest terrorist attack in history and the deadliest attack conducted by ISIL.
  - The 2014 FIFA World Cup started with hosts Brazil defeating Croatia 3–1.
- June 13
  - War against the Islamic State begins.
  - The Los Angeles Kings defeat the New York Rangers 3–2 in game 5 of the 2014 Stanley Cup Final to win the series 4–1 and win their second Stanley Cup in franchise history.
- June 14 – The Catholic Church removes restrictions on clerical marriage in the Eastern Catholic Churches' diaspora.
- June 15
  - The San Antonio Spurs defeat the Miami Heat in the 2014 NBA Finals, 4–1, to win their 5th championship in franchise history.
  - Australia wins the 2014 Hockey World Cup.
- June 19 – Felipe VI becomes King of Spain upon the abdication of his father, Juan Carlos I.
- June 29 – The Islamic State of Iraq and the Levant declares itself a caliphate.

=== July ===
- July 8 – In the 2014 FIFA World Cup semi-finals, hosts Brazil were shockingly beaten 7–1 by Germany after trailing 5-0 in 29 minutes.
- July 8–August 26 – Amid growing tensions between Israel and Hamas following the kidnapping and murder of three Israeli teenagers in June and the revenge killing of a Palestinian teenager in July, Israel launches Operation Protective Edge against Hamas-controlled Gaza Strip starting with numerous missile strikes, followed by a ground offensive a week later. In seven weeks of fighting, 2,100 Palestinians and 71 Israelis are killed.
- July 13 – Germany defeats Argentina 1-0 to win the 2014 FIFA World Cup.
- July 17 – Malaysia Airlines Flight 17, a Boeing 777, crashes in eastern Ukraine after being shot down by a missile. All 298 people on board are killed.
- July 18 – Typhoon Rammasun makes landfall in Hainan, China as a category 5 super typhoon, killing 88 and causing $7.14 billion in damages.
- July 20 – Monty Python Live (Mostly) closes in London, ending the famous British comedy group Monty Python, active since 1969.
- July 21 – The United Nations Security Council adopts Resolution 2166 in response to the shootdown of Malaysia Airlines Flight 17.
- July 23–August 3 – The 2014 Commonwealth Games takes place in Glasgow, Scotland.
- July 24 – Air Algérie Flight 5017, a McDonnell Douglas MD-83, crashes in Mali, killing all 116 people on board.
- July 26 – Washington DC metro opens Phase 1 of the silver line to Tysons Corner, Reston, and Loudoun county.
- July 28 – 100-year anniversary of World War I's commencement (Austria-Hungary declares war on Serbia).

=== August ===
- August 3 – Sinjar massacre, beginning of ISIS attacks resulting in the massacre of over 4,000 Yazidis in Iraq's Sinjar District.
- August 7 – Khmer Rouge leaders Nuon Chea and Khieu Samphan are found guilty of crimes against humanity and are sentenced to life imprisonment by the Khmer Rouge Tribunal.
- August 8
  - American-led intervention in Iraq: The United States military begins an air campaign in northern Iraq to stem the influx of ISIL militants.
  - The World Health Organization (WHO) declares the Ebola outbreak a Public Health Emergency of International Concern.
- August 9 – The shooting of Michael Brown, an African American, by a police officer occurs in Ferguson, Missouri, triggering riots.

=== September ===
- September 15
  - Microsoft buys Mojang Studios, the company that created Minecraft, for $2.5 billion.
  - Syrian civil war: ISIS militants launched an offensive to capture the town of Kobanî, which lasted for six months.
- September 18 – In the 2014 Scottish independence referendum, Scotland votes against independence from the United Kingdom.
- September 21 – The Battle of Sanaa leads to the start of the Yemeni Civil War, as Houthi forces capture the capital city Sanaa, followed by a rapid Houthi takeover of the government.
- September 22 – American-led intervention in Syria: The United States and several Arab partners begin their airstrike campaign in Syria.
- September 24 – The Mars Orbiter Mission, popularly known as Mangalyaan, which was launched on 5 November 2013 by the Indian Space Research Organisation, reached Martian orbit, making India the first Asian country to successfully reach Mars.
- September 26
  - The 2014 World Summit of Nobel Peace Laureates, to be held in Cape Town from 13 to 15 October, is suspended after a boycott of Nobel Laureates to protest the third time refusal of a visa to the 14th Dalai Lama by a South African Government "kowtowing to China".
  - Forty-three male students from the Ayotzinapa Rural Teachers' College are forcibly abducted in Iguala, Guerrero, Mexico. They were allegedly taken into custody by local police officers in collusion with organized crime. The mass kidnapping caused international protests and social unrest, leading to the resignation of Guerrero Governor Ángel Aguirre Rivero.
- September 27 – Mount Ontake, in Japan, erupts, killing several climbers on the slopes of the volcano.
- September 28 – Hong Kong protests: Benny Tai Yiu-ting announces that Occupy Central is launched as Hong Kong's government headquarters is being occupied by thousands of protesters. Hong Kong police resort to tear gas to disperse protesters but thousands remain.

=== October ===
- October 3 – Stefan Löfven replaces Fredrik Reinfeldt as Prime Minister of Sweden.
- October 19 – The Roman Catholic Church beatifies Pope Paul VI.
- October 20 – Joko Widodo is inaugurated as the 7th President of Indonesia.
- October 24 – Alan Eustace, an American computer scientist, sets a world record highest and longest free fall jump from 135,908 feet (41.425 km) over Roswell, New Mexico, United States, breaking the sound barrier without any machine assistance during a record space dive out of a massive helium-filled balloon. His descent to Earth lasts 4 minutes 27 seconds and stretches nearly 26 miles (42 km) with peak speeds exceeding 822 miles per hour (1,323 km/h), setting new world records for the highest free-fall jump and total free-fall distance 123,414 feet (37,617 m).
- October 31 – Longtime Burkina Faso President Blaise Compaoré resigns after widespread protests in response to his attempts to abolish presidential term limits.

=== November ===
- November 1 – Bangladesh faces a nationwide blackout.
- November 2 – The Intergovernmental Panel on Climate Change (IPCC) releases the final part of its Fifth Assessment Report, warning that the world faces "severe, pervasive and irreversible" damage from global emissions of CO_{2}.
- November 3 – The tallest building in the Western Hemisphere, One World Trade Center in New York City, opens.
- November 12 – The uncrewed Rosetta spacecraft's Philae probe successfully lands on Comet 67P, the first time in history that a spacecraft has landed on such an object.
- November 22 – Tamir Rice, a twelve-year-old African-American boy, is killed by a police officer in Cleveland, Ohio.

=== December ===
- December 3 – The Japanese space agency, JAXA, launches uncrewed spaceprobe Hayabusa2 from the Tanegashima Space Center on a six-year round-trip mission to Ryugu to collect rock samples.
- December 15 – Two hostages and terrorist Man Haron Monis are killed in the Lindt Cafe siege in Sydney, Australia.
- December 16 – 2014 Peshawar school massacre: The Pakistani Taliban carry out a mass shooting at an army school in Peshawar, Pakistan, killing at least 145 people, mostly schoolchildren.
  - African-American teenage boy George Stinney Jr.'s conviction of murdering two white girls back in 1944 is vacated due to him having received an unfair trial.
- December 17 – U.S. President Barack Obama announces the resumption of normal diplomatic relations between the U.S. and Cuba.
- December 28 – Indonesia AirAsia Flight 8501 from Surabaya, Indonesia, to Singapore crashes into the Java Sea just southwest of Borneo, killing all 162 people on board.
- December 31 – A stampede occurred on New Year's Eve in Shanghai, China, resulting in the deaths of 36 people and leaving 49 injured.

== Nobel Prizes ==
Nobel medal

- Chemistry – Eric Betzig, Stefan Hell and William E. Moerner
- Economics – Jean Tirole
- Literature – Patrick Modiano
- Peace – Kailash Satyarthi and Malala Yousafzai
- Physics – Isamu Akasaki, Hiroshi Amano and Shuji Nakamura
- Physiology or Medicine – John O'Keefe, May-Britt Moser and Edvard Moser

== New English words ==
- acute flaccid myelitis
- aro
- Black Lives Matter
- gig worker
- hard pass
- initial coin offering/ICO
- manspreading
- on fleek
- zoom

== See also ==
- List of international years
