= Heptanone =

Heptanone may refer to the following ketones with seven carbon atoms the formula C_{7}H_{14}O:

- 2-Heptanone (Methyl amyl ketone)
  - 5-Methyl-2-hexanone (Methyl isoamyl ketone)
  - 4-Methyl-2-hexanone (Methyl 2-methylbutyl ketone)
  - 3-Methyl-2-hexanone (Methyl 1-methylbutyl ketone)
  - 3,3-Dimethyl-2-pentanone
  - 4,4-Dimethyl-2-pentanone (Methyl neopentyl ketone)
  - 3,4-Dimethyl-2-pentanone
  - 3-Ethyl-2-pentanone
- 3-Heptanone
  - 2,4-Dimethyl-3-pentanone (Diisopropyl ketone)
  - 2,2-Dimethyl-3-pentanone
- 4-Heptanone
  - 2-Methyl-3-hexanone (Isopropyl propyl ketone)
  - 4-Methyl-3-hexanone (Ethyl sec-butyl ketone)
  - 5-Methyl-3-hexanone (Ethyl isobutyl ketone)

== See also ==
- Cycloheptanone
  - Methylcyclohexanone
    - 2-Methylcyclohexanone
    - 3-Methylcyclohexanone
    - 4-Methylcyclohexanone
