= 4-Methylcyclohexanemethanol =

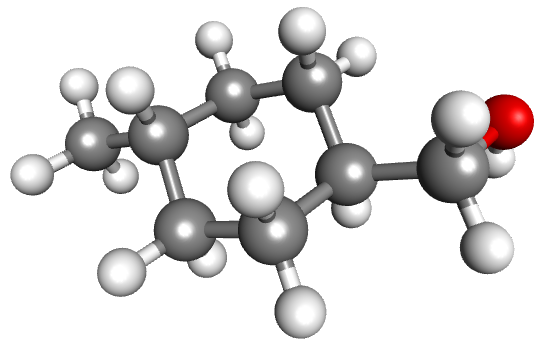

Names
- Preferred IUPAC name (4-Methylcyclohexyl)methanol
- Other names: 1-(hydroxymethyl)-4-methylcyclohexane; 4-methylcyclohexyl-1-carbinol; MCHM; hexahydro-p-tolyl-carbinol (archaic)

Identifiers
| CAS Number | 34885-03-5 |
| 3D model (JSmol) | Interactive image |
| ChEBI | CHEBI:157744 |
| ChEMBL | ChEMBL3184778 |
| ChemSpider | 105625 |
| ECHA InfoCard | 100.131.091 |
| EC Number | 609-038-8 |
| PubChem CID | 118193 |
| UNII | 1558K6RHM3 |
| CompTox Dashboard (EPA) | DTXSID9041813 |
- InChI: InChI=1S/C8H16O/c1-7-2-4-8(6-9)5-3-7/h7-9H,2-6H2,1H3 Key: OSINZLLLLCUKJH-UHFFFAOYSA-N
- SMILES: CC1CCC(CC1)CO

Properties
| Chemical formula | C_{8}H_{16}O |
| Molar mass | 128.215 g·mol^{−1} |
| Appearance | Colourless liquid |
| Odor | mint-like, licorice-like (trans) |
| Density | 0.9074 g/cm^{3} |
| Boiling point | 202 °C (396 °F; 475 K) |
| Solubility in water | low |
| Refractive index (n_{D}) | 1.4617 |

Hazards
- GHS labelling
| Pictograms | (GHS07: Exclamation mark) |
| Signal word | Warning |
| Hazard statements | H315, H319, H335 |
| Flash point | 80 °C (176 °F; 353 K) |
- Except where otherwise noted, data are given for materials in their standard state (at 25 °C [77 °F], 100 kPa). Infobox references

4-Methylcyclohexanemethanol (MCHM, systematic name 4-methylcyclohexylmethanol) is an organic compound with the formula CH_{3}C_{6}H_{10}CH_{2}OH. Classified as a saturated higher alicyclic primary alcohol. Both cis and trans isomers exist, depending on the relative positions of the methyl (CH_{3}) and hydroxymethyl (CH_{2}OH) groups on the cyclohexane ring. Commercial samples of MCHM consists of a mixture of these isomers as well as other components that vary with the supplier.

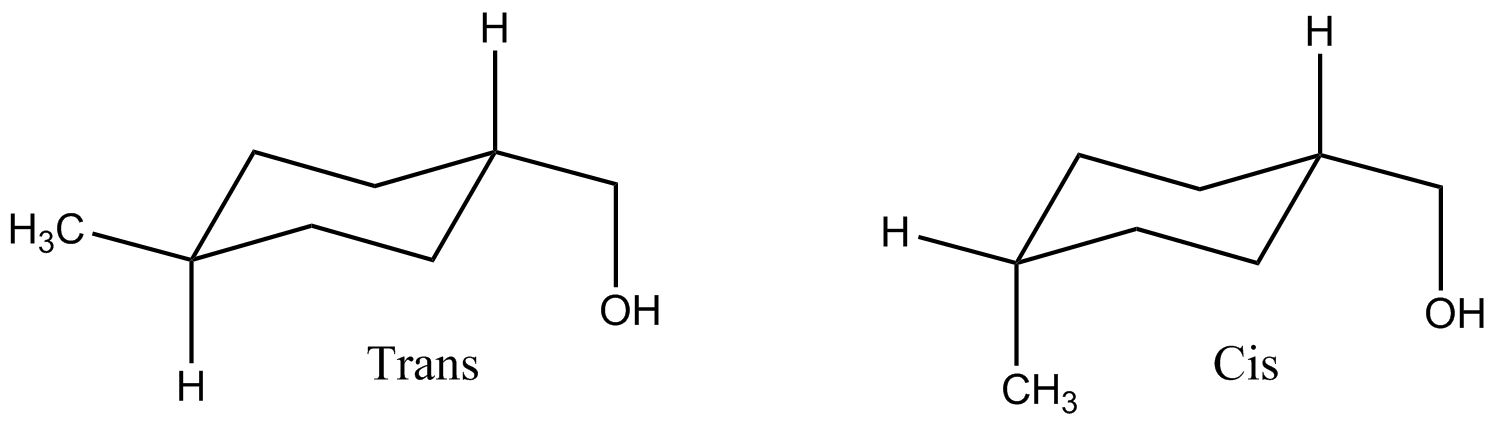
The cis and trans isomers of MCHM.

It is a colourless oil with a faint mint-like alcohol odor. The trans isomer has a particularly low odor threshold (~7 ppb in water) and a more licorice-like quality which is not associated with the less detectable cis isomer. Like other 8-carbon alcohols, such as 1-octanol, this compound is only slightly soluble in water but highly soluble in many organic solvents. The solubility of 1-octanol in water is 2.3 grams per liter.

== Synthesis and production ==
It was first prepared in 1908 by Bouveault–Blanc reduction of a methylcyclohexanecarboxylate ester.

It is also produced as a byproduct (ca. 1%) in the production of cyclohexanedimethanol, a commodity chemical, during hydrogenation of dimethyl terephthalate.

C_{6}H_{4}(CO_{2}CH_{3})_{2} + 8 H_{2} → CH_{3}C_{6}H_{10}CH_{2}OH + 2 CH_{3}OH + H_{2}O

== Uses ==
It has been patented for use in air fresheners.

U.S. Patent 4915825 describes a froth flotation process for cleaning coal where a mixture of 95% MCHM, 4% water, and 0.1% 4-methylcyclohexanemethanol monoether (such as 4-(methoxymethyl)cyclohexanemethanol) is used as a frothing agent, and finely divided coal particles adhere to air bubbles induced into the agent which rise to the surface. Other cyclohexane-based alcohols can also be used. MCHM has the advantage of being less toxic than previous frothing agents containing 2-ethylhexanol. The original patent owners let the patent expire after eight years for failure to pay maintenance fees.

== Health and safety ==
Reliable information on health and safety of this compound is limited. The ChemSpider entry for MCHM indicates that it has been evaluated for ligand activity via SimBioSys's LASSO analysis, which predicted low to no activity on 40 biologically significant receptors, indicating a low likelihood for significant biological activity on them. Eastman Chemical Company's MSDS for "crude" (unpurified) MCHM, as supplied by NPR, reports an oral LD-50 of 825 mg/kg and a dermal LD-50 greater than 2,000 mg/kg, both in rats. Further data from Eastman's internal studies was released after the Elk River, West Virginia (2014) spill, including the studies upon which the LD-50 estimate was based and one 28-day study of oral toxicity of pure MCHM which concluded that 400 mg/kg doses were associated with erythropoietic, liver, and kidney effects, though these were not considered more than "minor toxicity" and the "no observed effect" level was considered to be 100 mg/kg/day.

=== General chemical class and closely related compounds ===
A World Health Organization study of the toxicity of alicyclic primary alcohols and related alicyclic carbohydrates (of which MCHM is one type) found that LD-50 values for substances in this class generally "ranged from 890 to 5700 mg/kg bw for rats and > 1000 to 4000 mg/kg bw for mice, demonstrating that the oral acute toxicity of alicyclic primary alcohols, aldehydes, acids and related esters is low". The same study indicated that these alcohols are metabolized primarily to corresponding carboxylic acids, which in the case of MCHM is 4-methylcyclohexanecarboxylic acid (CAS 13064–83–0), a naphthenic acid. The toxicity and environmental properties of these naphthenic acids have been well studied recently due to their occurrence as a major contaminant in water used for extraction of oil from tar sands. Naphthenic acids have both acute and chronic toxicity to fish and other organisms. The methyl ester of this acid is also listed as one of the major impurities in the "crude MCHM" as supplied by Eastman.

=== Cyclohexanedimethanol ===
The closely related compound cyclohexanedimethanol (CAS 105–08–8) exhibits low toxicity (3.5 g/kg) when fed orally to rats.

=== Cyclohexanemethanol ===
Cyclohexanemethanol (or cyclohexylmethanol, CHM, CAS 100–49–2), another closely related compound, which differs only in lacking a methyl substituent, has been found as a naturally occurring fusel alcohol in mango wine at concentrations of 1.45 mg/L, in which it is considered an aroma constituent. LASSO analysis predicts low to no activity on 40 receptors, similarly to MCHM.

=== p-menthan-7-ol ===
CHM with a methylethyl (or isopropyl) substituent group at the same position as the methyl group in 4-methylcyclohexanemethanol (cis-4-(1-methylethyl) cyclohexane methanol, CAS 13828–37–0) is regarded as a flavoring and fragrance agent, sometimes listed under the synonym p-menthan-7-ol, and was the subject of a review article on its toxicological and dermatological properties in 2008. Among other findings, Bhatia et al. reported a 14-day oral toxicity study in rats with doses of 10.0 g/kg by gavage with no deaths or toxic effects observed, nor any abnormalities on necropsy. Dermal application of "neat" (pure, undiluted) cis-p-menthan-7-ol at 2 g/kg bodyweight produced toxic effects in rats and rabbits.

Various patch tests of cis-p-menthan-7-ol on human volunteers with concentrations of 10%, 15%, and 20% produced irritation in one instance, and a "questionable" reaction in another. These both occurred out of a group of 102 volunteers with a 15% concentration in diethyl phthalate and ethanol. However, a longer-term (six-week) repetition of that test as a sensitization study failed to produce any reactions.

A WHO study concluded that p-menthan-7-ol was of "no safety concern" for human consumption at high levels of 2.5 μg/kg of bodyweight and for typical levels in Japan of 0.03 μg/day.

=== 2,4-dimethylcyclohexanemethanol ===
Another CHM derivative, 2,4-dimethylcyclohexanemethanol (CAS 68480–15–9, also dihydrofloralol or floral methanol), which has two methyl substituents instead of one, is frequently marketed as a fragrance or flavor additive. One web site, Fantastic Flavours provides a list of recognized flavor additives for Japan, which includes 2,4-dimethylcyclohexanemethanol by virtue of being in the group of aliphatic higher alcohols.

=== Incidents ===
On 9 January 2014, approximately 10,000 US gal (38,000 L) of impure MCHM leaked from a storage tank near the banks of the Elk River near Charleston, West Virginia (U.S.), from where an undetermined amount entered the river and was taken into the local water system (1,272 gallons were reported recovered). State and federal agencies declared a state of emergency and ordered over 300,000 residents in nine counties—one sixth of West Virginia's population—not to drink or use tap water for any purpose other than flushing toilets. The external affairs manager of West Virginia American Water said that the spill originated with Freedom Industries, a Charleston company.
