= 1,4-Cyclohexanedimethanol diglycidyl ether =

Names
- Preferred IUPAC name 2,2′-[Cyclohexane-1,4-diylbis(methyleneoxymethylene)]bis(oxirane)
- Other names: 1,4-Bis(glycidyloxymethyl)cyclohexane; 1,4-Bis((2,3-epoxypropoxy)methyl)cyclohexane; 2,2'-(1,4-Cyclohexanediylbis(methyleneoxymethylene))bis-oxirane

Identifiers
CAS Number	14228-73-0
3D model (JSmol)	Interactive image
ChEMBL	ChEMBL3184513
ChemSpider	55618
ECHA InfoCard	100.034.620
EC Number	238-098-4
PubChem CID	61718
CompTox Dashboard (EPA)	DTXSID1044805
- InChI: InChI=1S/C14H24O4/c1-2-12(6-16-8-14-10-18-14)4-3-11(1)5-15-7-13-9-17-13/h11-14H,1-10H2 Key: VQMQXWYQIIUJIT-UHFFFAOYSA-N
- SMILES: C1CC(CCC1COCC2CO2)COCC3CO3

Properties
Chemical formula	C_{14}H_{24}O_{4}
Molar mass	256.342 g·mol^{−1}

Hazards
- GHS labelling
Pictograms	(GHS07: Exclamation mark)
Signal word	Warning
Hazard statements	H315, H317, H319, H412
Precautionary statements	P261, P264, P264+P265, P272, P273, P280, P302+P352, P305+P351+P338, P321, P332+P317, P333+P313, P337+P317, P362+P364, P501
- Except where otherwise noted, data are given for materials in their standard state (at 25 °C [77 °F], 100 kPa). Infobox references

1,4-Cyclohexanedimethanol diglycidyl ether is an organic chemical in the glycidyl ether family. Its formula is C_{14}H_{24}O_{4} and the IUPAC name is 2-[4-(oxiran-2-ylmethoxymethyl)cyclohexyl]methoxymethyl]oxirane. It has the CAS number of 14228-73-0 and is REACH registered in Europe. An industrial chemical, a key use is in the reduction of the viscosity of epoxy resin systems functioning as a reactive diluent.

== Synonyms ==
The material is known under various names which include:

- 2,2'-[1,4-Cyclohexanediylbis(methyleneoxymethylene)]bis[oxirane]
- 1,4-Bis(glycidoxymethyl)cyclohexane
- 1,4-Bis(hydroxymethyl)cyclohexane diglycidyl Ether
- 1,4-Bis[(2,3-epoxypropoxy)methyl]cyclohexane
- 1,4-Bis[(glycidyloxy)methyl]cyclohexane
- 1,4-Cyclohexanedimethanol diglycidyl Ether

== Manufacture ==
The manufacturing process involves reacting cyclohexanedimethanol with epichlorohydrin, using a Lewis acid as catalyst, to form a halohydrin. This is followed by washing with sodium hydroxide in a dehydrochlorination step to form the epoxide rings. The waste products are water and sodium chloride and excess caustic soda. One of the quality control tests would involve measuring the Epoxy value by determination of the epoxy equivalent weight.

== Uses ==
As the molecule has oxirane functionality, a key use is reducing the viscosity of epoxy resins. These reactive diluent modified epoxy resins may then be further formulated into which may then be formulated into CASE applications: Coatings, Adhesives, Sealants, Elastomers, and electronic encapsulant. The use of the diluent does affect mechanical properties and microstructure of epoxy resins.

It is also used as a monomer in UV curing systems. In addition it is used to synthesize other molecules such as the acrylated version.

== Toxicology ==
The material is classed as a skin irritant.

== See also ==
- Glycidol
