= Cyclohexanedimethanol =

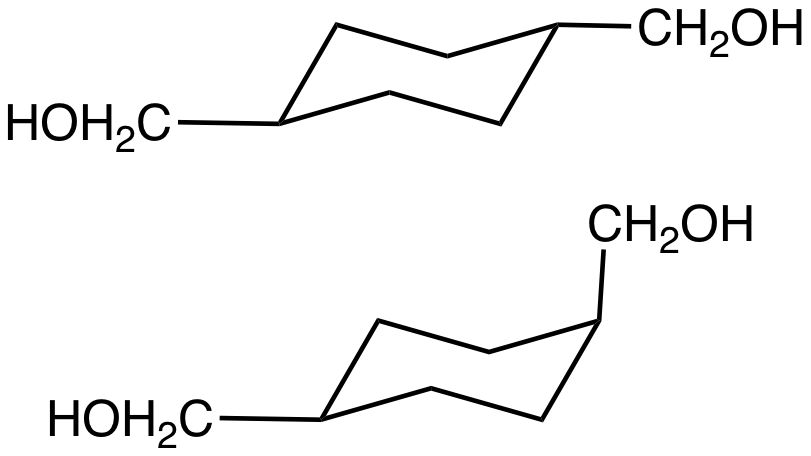

Names
- IUPAC name [4-(hydroxymethyl)cyclohexyl]methanol
- Preferred IUPAC name (cyclohexane-1,4-diyl)dimethanol
- Other names 1,4–Cyclohexanedimethanol; CHDM; 1,4-Bis(hydroxymethyl)cyclohexane

Identifiers
CAS Number	105-08-8
3D model (JSmol)	Interactive image
ChemSpider	7449
ECHA InfoCard	100.002.972
PubChem CID	7735
UNII	8C3FKR6R1B
CompTox Dashboard (EPA)	DTXSID9026712
- InChI: InChI=1S/C8H16O2/c9-5-7-1-2-8(6-10)4-3-7/h7-10H,1-6H2 Key: YIMQCDZDWXUDCA-UHFFFAOYSA-N; InChI=1/C8H16O2/c9-5-7-1-2-8(6-10)4-3-7/h7-10H,1-6H2 Key: YIMQCDZDWXUDCA-UHFFFAOYAS
- SMILES: C1CC(CCC1CO)CO

Properties
Chemical formula	C_{8}H_{16}O_{2}
Molar mass	144.21 g/mol
Appearance	White waxy solid
Density	1.02 g/ml
Melting point	41 to 61 °C (106 to 142 °F; 314 to 334 K)
Boiling point	284 to 288 °C (543 to 550 °F; 557 to 561 K)
- Except where otherwise noted, data are given for materials in their standard state (at 25 °C [77 °F], 100 kPa). verify (what is ?) Infobox references

Cyclohexanedimethanol (CHDM) is a mixture of isomeric organic compounds with formula C_{6}H_{10}(CH_{2}OH)_{2}. It is a colorless low-melting solid used in the production of polyester resins. Commercial samples consist of a mixture of cis and trans isomers. It is a di-substituted derivative of cyclohexane and is classified as a diol, meaning that it has two OH functional groups. Commercial CHDM typically has a cis/trans ratio of 30:70.

== Production ==
CHDM is produced by catalytic hydrogenation of dimethyl terephthalate (DMT). The reaction conducted in two steps beginning with the conversion of DMT to the diester dimethyl 1,4-cyclohexanedicarboxylate (DMCD):

C_{6}H_{4}(CO_{2}CH_{3})_{2} + 3 H_{2} → C_{6}H_{10}(CO_{2}CH_{3})_{2}

In the second step DMCD is further hydrogenated to CHDM:

C_{6}H_{10}(CO_{2}CH_{3})_{2} + 4 H_{2} → C_{6}H_{10}(CH_{2}OH)_{2} + 2 CH_{3}OH

A copper chromite catalyst is usually used industrially. The cis/trans ratio of the CHDM is affected by the catalyst.

Byproduct of this process are 4-methylcyclohexanemethanol (CH_{3}C_{6}H_{10}CH_{2}OH) and the monoester methyl 4-methyl-4-cyclohexanecarboxylate (CH_{3}C_{6}H_{10}CO_{2}CH_{3}, CAS registry number 51181-40-9). The leading producers in CHDM are Eastman Chemical in US and SK Chemicals in South Korea.

== Applications ==
Via the process called polycondensation, CHDM is a precursor to polyesters. It is one of the most important comonomers for production of polyethylene terephthalate (PET), or polyethylene terephthalic ester (PETE), from which plastic bottles are made. In addition it maybe spun to form carpet fibers.

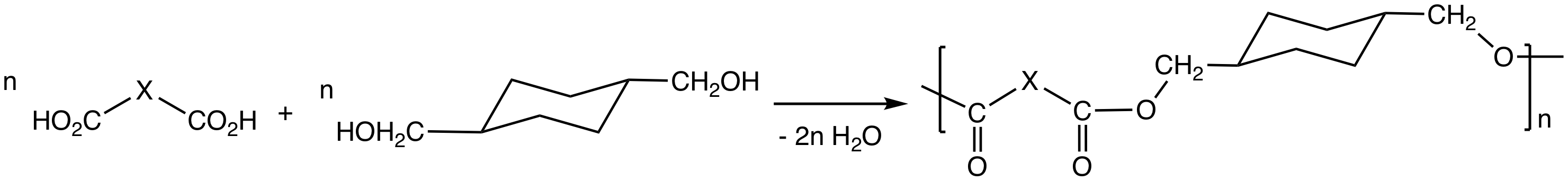

Thermoplastic polyesters containing CHDM exhibit enhanced strength, clarity, and solvent resistance. The properties of the polyesters vary from the high melting crystalline poly(1,4-cyclohexylenedimethylene terephthalate), PCT, to the non-crystalline copolyesters derived from both ethylene glycol and CHDM. The properties of these polyesters also is affected by the cis/trans ratio of the CHDM monomer. CHDM reduces the degree of crystallinity of PET homopolymer, improving its processability. The copolymer tends to resist degradation, e.g. to acetaldehyde. The copolymer with PET is known as glycol-modified polyethylene terephthalate, PETG. PETG is used in many fields, including electronics, automobiles, barrier, and medical, etc.

CHDM is a raw material for the production of 1,4-cyclohexanedimethanol diglycidyl ether, an epoxy diluent. The key use for this diglycidyl ether is to reduce the viscosity of epoxy resins.
