= Jangseong Nursing Home fire =

2014 arson in South Korea

- Date: May 28, 2014
- Time: 12:27 AM (KST)
- Location: Jangseong County, South Jeolla Province, South Korea
- Also known as: Hyosarang Care Hospital arson
- Type: Building fire
- Cause: Arson (suspected)
- Deaths: 21
- Injuries: 8

On 28 May 2014, a fire broke out at Jangseong Nursing Hospital (Korean: 장성 요양병원) at the Hyosarang Care Hospital in Jangseong County, South Jeolla Province, South Korea. It is suspected to have been started by an 81 year-old patient with dementia and killed 21 people and injured 8 others.

== Fire ==
CCTV footage showed the 81 year-old man, known to the media only by his surname Kim, entering and leaving a utility room at 12:25 AM. The fire was shown on CCTV spreading from the room 12:27 AM. At the time of the fire there was 34 patients and one nurse on the second floor and 44 patients and another nurse on the first. 20 patients and one nurse died in the accident, all from smoke inhalation and all on the second floor. Over 270 firefighters from the Damyang Fire Department put out the fire in around six minutes.

== Aftermath ==
On 5 June 2014, the hospital's chairman Lee Sa-moon (54 at the time) was arrested on charges of negligent homicide resulting from an accident. The 81 year-old man denied his involvement, however evidence such as singed hairs on his arms and CCTV video contradicted this.
