= Simbiosys =

SimBioSys
- Company type: [Private]
- Industry: Life Sciences
- Founded: 2018
- Headquarters: Champaign, IL, USA
- Key people: Tushar Pandey, Chief Executive Officer
- Website: www.simbiosys.com

SimBioSys (short for Simulated Biological Systems) is a technology company deploying a combination of artificial intelligence and biophysical simulations to improve the personalized and patient-specific understanding of cancer.

SimBioSys developed a simulation engine, TumorScope, which utilizes current standard of care diagnostic data (imaging & pathology) to create spatially resolved virtual replicas of an individual tumor and microenvironment and uses mechanistic models to incorporate the major hallmarks of cancer including drug sensitivity & delivery, metabolism, mechanical forces. The simulations enable precise & comprehensive predictions of response to therapy while providing researchers and clinicians keys insights into mechanisms of resistance. By virtualizing cancer, clinicians and patients are empowered with a better understanding of the disease and can assess all available options computationally to truly individualize treatment.

In the crowded world of genomics, new approaches have many barriers to becoming a new standard of care. SimBioSys complements and/or supersedes current precision medicine techniques while only relying on readily available and previously acquired datasets.

== Products ==
The first indication to market will be Early Stage Breast Cancer where there is significant opportunity to improve outcomes by selecting the right first line therapy while de-escalating care and lowering costs and side effects.

A retrospective study across 800 patients demonstrated volumetric errors under 4%. A recent pivotal study at University of Chicago, TumorScope™ produced 91% sensitivity and 93% specificity rates of predicting complete response to the physician's choice of therapy at the time of diagnosis. SimBioSys collaborates with over 130 oncologists across the country representing 16 premier cancer centers such University of Chicago, University of North Carolina, OHSU, among others.

SimBioSys anticipates FDA clearance for its breast cancer surgical planning tool in late 2023 with an expansion to other solid tumors to follow. Validation to lung and prostate cancer is already underway. While awaiting FDA approval, SimBioSys is commercializing the technology for use in patient education and drug development.

== See also ==
- Precision Medicine
- Clinical Trial Optimization
- Virtual Trials
- Drug design
