= Guen massacre =

2014 mass killing of Muslim civilians in the Central African Republic

- Part of the Central African Republic Civil War
- Guen (Central African Republic) Location of Guen within the Central African Republic
- Location: 4.965°N 15.462°E; Guen, Gadzi sub-prefecture, Mambéré-Kadéï, CAR
- Date: February 1, 2014 – February 5, 2014 (UTC+01:00)
- Target: Muslim civilians
- Attack type: Mass shooting, machete attack, ethnic cleansing
- Weapons: Firearms, machetes
- Deaths: 72
- Perpetrator: Anti-balaka militia
- Motive: Religious/ethnic retaliation and control of diamond-rich areas

The Guen massacre was a series of mass murders of Muslim civilians carried out by Anti-balaka militia units in February 2014. The killings occurred in the town of Guen, located in the Mambéré-Kadéï prefecture of the Central African Republic. The massacre resulted in the death of 72 individuals and the total displacement of the local Muslim population.

== Background ==
The massacre took place against the backdrop of the civil war. The Anti-balaka militias originally mobilized in response to widespread abuses committed by the predominantly Muslim Séléka coalition, leading to severe religious polarization and retaliatory violence against Muslim civilians. Guen, a town significant for its diamond resources, became a primary target for local Anti-balaka commanders who sought to drive out the Muslim minority. Reports indicate that the violence was driven by a combination of this sectarian animosity and a strategic struggle for control over lucrative mining territories. Furthermore, the assault on Guen was part of a broader, coordinated campaign of violence by these groups that also targeted the neighboring localities of Gadzi and Djomo within the same sub-prefecture.

The diamond-rich region around Guen had long been a source of tension. According to the UN Panel of Experts, after the massacre anti-balaka commanders sought to establish protection rackets over diamond collectors and miners, effectively replacing the displaced Muslim traders who had dominated the local mining economy. The violence in Guen was thus not only an act of religious persecution but also part of a broader campaign to seize economic resources and consolidate territorial control in the west of the country.

== Massacre ==
The atrocity was carried out in two distinct phases:

=== February 1 assault ===
On February 1, 2014, Anti-balaka forces launched an assault on the Muslim quarter of Guen. According to investigative reports by the Special Criminal Court and Human Rights Watch, at least 27 people were killed in the initial attack.

=== February 5 executions ===
Four days later, on February 5, the militia gathered approximately 45 Muslim men who had sought refuge in a local compound. The victims were executed by gunfire. According to the UN Panel of Experts, the attackers surrounded the house, separated the men from women and children, and then killed at least 43 of them in a systematic execution. Investigative reports and local testimony confirmed a total death toll of 72 fatalities for the week.

== Legal proceedings ==
Justice for the Guen massacre has been pursued through the Special Criminal Court (CPS), a hybrid tribunal established to prosecute war crimes. The massacre was first documented by the United Nations Panel of Experts in 2014, which identified Edmond Beina as a leader of the attack and called for accountability.

- Investigation (2020–2024): A formal investigation was opened by the Special Prosecutor on January 30, 2020. Over four years, the CPS Investigative Chamber collected evidence regarding the targeted killing of Muslim civilians in Guen, Gadzi, and Djomo.
- Indictment (December 2024): On December 6, 2024, the court found sufficient evidence to try Mathurin Kombo, François Boybanda (alias Balere), Philémon Kahena (alias CB), Dieudonné Gomitoua, and Edmond Beina. They were charged with crimes against humanity and war crimes, including murder, extermination, and persecution.
- Referral to Trial (July 2025): Following the rejection of appeals by the accused, the case was officially referred to the Trial Chamber (Chambre d'Assises).
- Fugitive Status: One suspect, Jean Bahara, remains at large and has been the subject of an active arrest warrant since May 3, 2022.
