= 2014 Elk River chemical spill =

Industrial disaster in western West Virginia

- Counties (pictured) in West Virginia affected by the 2014 Elk River chemical spill.
- Date: January 9, 2014
- Location: Freedom Industries (Charleston facility) 1015 Barlow Drive Charleston, West Virginia United States; 38°22′7.98″N 81°36′23.82″W
- Cause: Release of up to 10,000 U.S. gallons (38,000 liters; 8,300 imperial gallons) of crude 4-Methylcyclohexanemethanol into the Elk River
- Participants: Freedom Industries; West Virginia American Water
- Outcome: Up to 300,000 residents within nine counties in the Charleston, West Virginia metropolitan area were without access to potable water
- Injuries: 169+ affected 14 hospitalized

The Elk River chemical spill occurred on January 9, 2014, when crude 4-methylcyclohexanemethanol (MCHM) was released from a Freedom Industries facility into the Elk River, a tributary of the Kanawha River, in Charleston in the U.S. state of West Virginia.

The spill happened upstream from the principal West Virginia American Water intake and treatment and distribution center. Following the spill, up to 300,000 residents within nine counties in the Charleston, West Virginia metropolitan area were without access to potable water. The areas affected were portions of Boone, Clay, Jackson, Kanawha, Lincoln, Logan, Putnam, and Roane counties and the Culloden area of Cabell County.

Crude MCHM is a chemical foam used to wash coal and remove impurities that contribute to pollution during combustion. The "do-not-use" advisory for drinking water from West Virginia American Water's system began to be gradually lifted by West Virginia state officials on January 13 based upon "priority zones."

On Tuesday, January 14, the company revealed that the tank, which leaked about 7,500 gallons into the ground by the Elk River, had also contained a mixture of glycol ethers known as PPH, with a similar function as MCHM.

The Elk River spill was the third chemical accident to take place in the Kanawha River Valley within the previous five years. On June 12, 2014, another spill of containment water occurred at the same site.

== Freedom Industries ==
Freedom Industries was founded in 1992 by Melody, and Carl L. Kennedy II. On December 31, 2013, Freedom Industries merged with three other companies, Etowah River Terminal, Poca Blending, and Crete Technologies. Gary Southern became president of Freedom Industries on December 10, 2013, and remained president until April 2014 when Chemstream appointed a reorganization officer. The company distributed chemicals used in coal mining.

Freedom Industries' Charleston facility was located along the Elk River, approximately 1.5 miles (2.4 km) upstream from the river's confluence with the Kanawha River, Previously in use by Etowah River Terminal, the facility stored chemicals in 14 storage tanks with a capacity of 4 million gallons. The facility stored chemicals, but did not conduct coal cleaning. Eastman Chemical Company was the manufacturer of the crude MCHM. Federal and West Virginia state regulators had not inspected the Freedom Industries chemical storage site in Charleston since 1991 when the facility was owned by Pennzoil, according to the West Virginia Department of Environmental Protection (WVDEP). Under state law, the facility had been required to have only an industrial stormwater permit, which it possessed. Freedom Industries was required to test the rain runoff every quarter, and send the results to the DEP.

Under the federal Emergency Planning and Community Right-to-Know Act, Freedom Industries filed its "Tier Two" form in February 2013, which contained detailed information about each chemical it was storing at its Charleston facility. Following its filing of the tier two form, West Virginia state emergency response officials and Kanawha County emergency planners and responders received copies. These entities received copies of the form under law so that its chemical inventory information could be utilized to prepare plans for possible accidents.

== 4-Methylcyclohexanemethanol ==
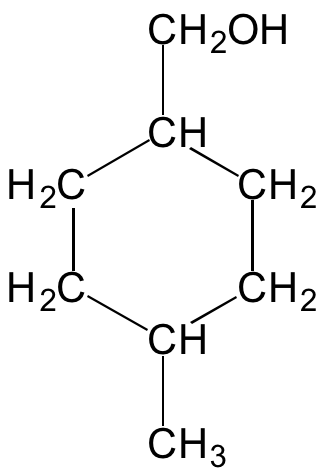
Chemical structure of 4-Methylcyclohexanemethanol.

4-Methylcyclohexanemethanol (MCHM), or more appropriately 4-methylcyclohexylmethanol, is an organic compound with the formula CH_{3}C_{6}H_{10}CH_{2}OH. Classified as an alcohol, it exists as two isomers with similar properties. MCHM is a colorless oil with an odor of licorice.

The extent of reliable information of this chemical is still unknown. Further data from Eastman's internal studies was released after the Elk River, West Virginia (2014) spill, including the studies upon which the LD-50 estimate was based and one 28-day study of oral toxicity of pure MCHM which concluded that 400 mg/kg doses were associated with erythropoietic, liver, and kidney effects, though these were not considered more than "minor toxicity" and the "no observed effect" level was considered to be 100 mg/kg/day.

Crude MCHM is a chemical foaming agent utilized in the processing of coal at coal preparation plants to remove impurities that contribute to pollution during combustion. The chemical washes coal in a process known as "froth flotation," which involves the separation of sand-size particles of coal from the surrounding rock within a tank of water or other solution. MCHM is utilized in about 20 to 25 percent of coal preparation plants in West Virginia.

MCHM is not used in the majority of West Virginia's coal preparation plants, because it is only used to produce coal for metallurgical purposes, a type of coal known as "coking coal" and most West Virginia plants process coal that is to be used for the generation of electricity.

Diesel fuel was originally used for the froth flotation process, but it was replaced by MCHM because of air emissions regulations.

Glycol ethers are a group of solvents based on alkyl ethers of ethylene glycol commonly used in paints. These solvents typically have a higher boiling point, together with the favorable solvent properties of lower-molecular weight ethers and alcohols.

== Incident ==
The spill began on Thursday, January 9, 2014, when up to 7,500 U.S. gallons (28,000 liters; 6,200 imperial gallons) of crude MCHM leaked from a one-inch hole in the bottom of a stainless steel storage tank capable of holding 40,000 U.S. gallons (150,000 liters; 33,000 imperial gallons) and its containment area at Freedom Industries' Charleston facility. The MCHM leaked from the containment area and into the ground, through which it traveled into the Elk River. The chemical spill occurred 1 mile (1.6 km) upstream from West Virginia American Water's raw water intake at its Kanawha Valley Water Treatment Plant. The Elk River measured approximately 7 feet (2.1 m) in depth at the time of the spill.

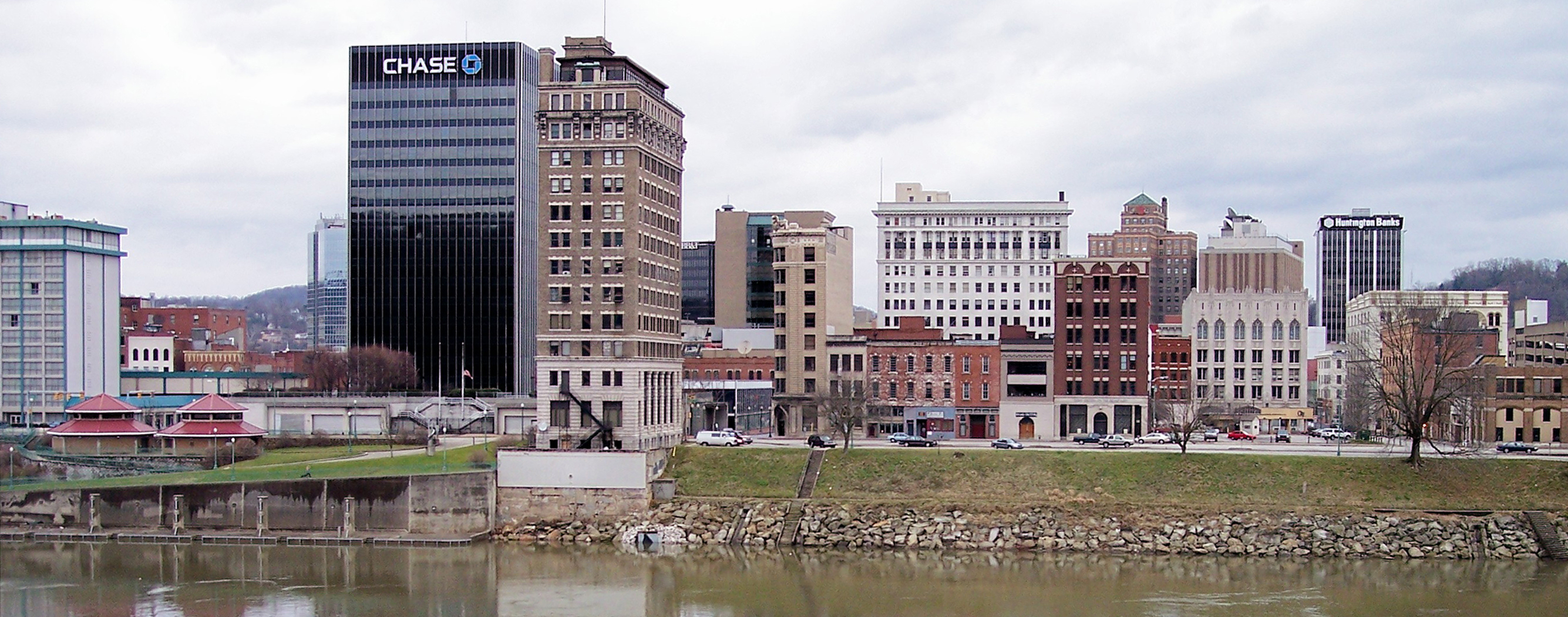
Charleston's downtown skyline (pictured) viewed from the south bank of the Kanawha River, of which the Elk River is a tributary.

The spill was noticed around mid morning on January 9 by several Charleston area residents when they began to notice a "sweet smell"(like Licorice) in the air. DEP began receiving odor complaints from Charleston residents at 8:15 a.m. According to Freedom Industries, two employees noticed leakage from the tank into the containment area around 10:30 a.m. on January 9. According to the company's president, Gary Southern, workers began cleanup immediately by hauling away the remaining MCHM in the storage tank and vacuuming the spilled MCHM from the ground nearby.

However, the DEP, whose inspectors discovered the leak at 11:10 a.m. in response to residents' complaints about the odor, contradicted Southern's claim. When the department's inspectors arrived at the facility, they observed the MCHM leaking through a concrete block containment dike with no cleanup or containment measures underway. Inspectors found a 4-foot (1.2 m) wide stream of chemical liquid flowing across the floor of the containment dike and into the ground where the dike's wall joined with its floor. According to DEP inspectors, they discovered a pool of clear liquid measuring approximately 400 square feet (37 m^{2}) in size outside of the damaged white stainless steel tank, Number 396. DEP inspectors also stated that Freedom Industries' workers had set up one cinder block and a 50 pounds (23 kg) bag of safety absorbent powder to stop the flow of the stream of leaking chemical.

DEP air quality inspector Mike Kolb described the scene as "a Band-Aid approach" and stated further that it was "apparent that this was not an event that had just happened." The DEP and the Kanawha County Fire Department had been able to locate the origin of the leak by tracing the smell. At the time of the leak's discovery by the inspectors, the damaged storage tank contained about 30,000 U.S. gallons (110,000 liters; 25,000 imperial gallons) of MCHM.

West Virginia American Water was aware of the chemical spill by noon, but assumed that they could filter it. By 4 p.m., when its carbon filtration system could no longer handle the large amount of contamination in the water and the chemical began flowing through the carbon filter, they decided to report the problem. This they did at 5:09 p.m. West Virginia American Water concluded that its tap water was unsafe for use and instructed its customers to cease using its tap water at 5:45 p.m. Freedom Industries failed to contact West Virginia American Water following the spill, and West Virginia American Water was instead notified by the DEP.

Freedom Industries refused initial media inquiries following the spill. The company's president, Gary Southern gave a ten-minute news conference the next evening, January 10.

=== Local residents ===
Residents were advised not to drink, cook with, bathe, or wash with West Virginia American Water tap water; up to 300,000 residents were affected. The area affected spanned nine counties within the Charleston, West Virginia metropolitan area. The areas affected included Boone, Clay, Jackson, Kanawha, Lincoln, Logan, Putnam, and Roane counties and in the Culloden area of Cabell. The majority of Cabell County was unaffected as its public water system uses water from the Ohio River, and some residents in Saint Albans in Kanawha County, Lincoln County and Hurricane in Putnam county were not affected by the water ban as they were served by local public water systems.

The West Virginia Department of Health and Human Resources stated that 122 people had sought treatment by January 11 for symptoms including nausea and vomiting. Of those 122 people, four people had been admitted to the Charleston Area Medical Center and one at another area hospital for observation with symptoms of nausea. On January 12, the number of patients treated at hospitals for their symptoms from chemical exposure grew to about 169. By that evening of January 10, nearly 700 residents had contacted West Virginia's poison control center, reporting a range of symptoms including nausea and rashes. On January 13, the total number of residents who had been hospitalized had risen to 10, and by January 14, the total reached 14, although none were in serious condition.

By 1 p.m. on January 10, the sweet-smelling odor was no longer detectable, according to West Virginia National Guard Adjutant, Major General James Hoyer. On January 11, the chief of DEP's Homeland Security and Emergency Response division, Mike Dorsey, stated that 7,500 U.S. gallons (28,000 liters; 6,200 imperial gallons) of MCHM had spilled into the river, 2,500 U.S. gallons (9,500 liters; 2,100 imperial gallons) more than had previously been estimated.

The "do-not-use" advisory on drinking water from the West Virginia American Water system began to be lifted by West Virginia state officials on January 13, five days after it had been put into effect following the January 9 detection of the chemical spill. The lifting of the ban started with hospital facilities and extended zone by zone within the West Virginia American Water system. Following the gradual end to the "do-not-use" advisory, affected Charleston area residents were instructed to flush water from their pipes, hot water tanks, and the icemakers in their refrigerators. West Virginia American Water began lifting the "do-not-use" ban in downtown Charleston, and would begin phasing in use of the system's drinking water based upon "priority zones." By the evening of January 13, 15 percent of West Virginia American Water's customers were permitted to begin using the drinking water.

On January 13, a Kanawha County Circuit Court judge issued a temporary restraining order to preserve evidence at the Freedom Industries' Charleston facility. The order also prohibited the company from modifying in any manner "any structure, tank, equipment, material or condition of" its facility, except as necessary to stop and clean up the chemical spill.

On January 21, Freedom Industries notified West Virginia Department of Environmental Protection that a second chemical, polyglycol ethers (PPH), was in the leaking tank with the MCHM. The department said that the failure to report accurately the type of materials and the quantities is a violation of state law.

A one-year incident timeline can be found published in the Supporting Information section of a 2014 research paper

A case study of the incident can be found published here . This report only includes information that was publicly available as of March 2016. This report does not include the findings and information released by the US Chemical Hazard and Safety Board, US National Toxicology Program, and other academic studies. Information disclosed as part of these studies indicated more than 100 mg/L of 4-MCHM was present in the Elk River, levels greater than 3.773 ppm 4-MCHM were present in the water treatment plant, among other information.

== Government response ==
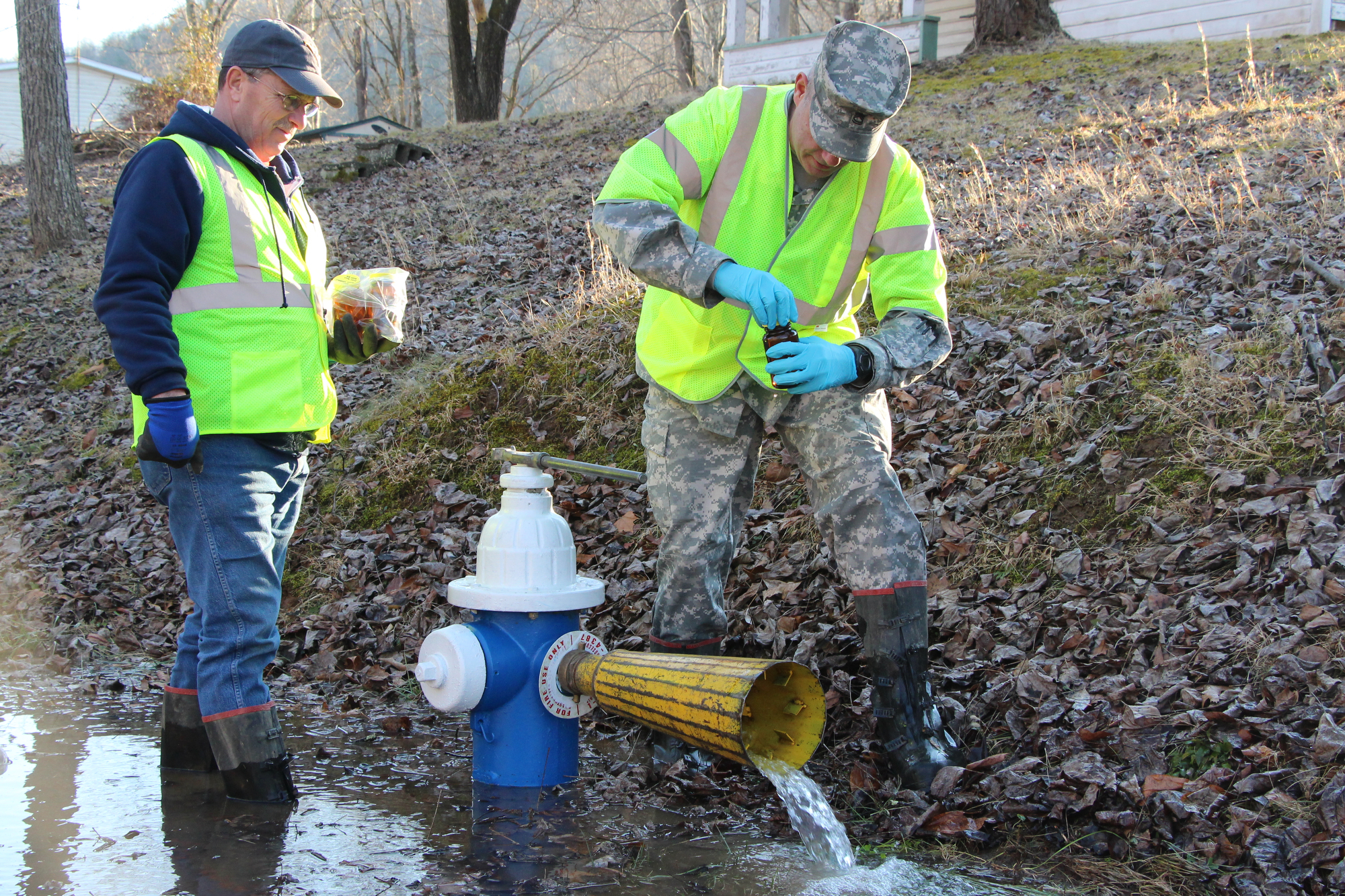
Va. Guard personnel assist W.Va. water collection operations.

On January 9, West Virginia Governor Earl Ray Tomblin declared a state of emergency, and activated the West Virginia National Guard. Governor Tomblin ordered residents within the spill's affected areas to "continue to refrain from using the water for drinking, cooking, cleaning, bathing and washing." United States President Barack Obama further declared the chemical spill a Federal state of emergency on January 9. Following the President's declaration, the Federal Emergency Management Agency (FEMA) was directed to provide both assistance on the ground and federal funding for the state's emergency management efforts.

FEMA and the West Virginia National Guard distributed bottled water to the nine affected counties. The West Virginia Bureau of Public Health and the West Virginia National Guard began working on a "long-term" plan to ensure the availability of water and food supplies for residents in the affected areas. The West Virginia National Guard also provided potable water in tankers. On January 10, FEMA had sent 75 trucks, each carrying about 4,900 U.S. gallons (19,000 liters; 4,100 imperial gallons) of water. By the morning of January 11, the U.S. Department of Homeland Security had sent 16 tractor trailers of bottled water to 16 distribution centers around the Charleston metropolitan area. At a news conference on January 11, FEMA officials announced they had already brought approximately 370,000 U.S. gallons (1,400,000 liters; 310,000 imperial gallons) of potable water into affected areas. The unaffected city water departments in Milton and Hurricane and the Putnam Public Service District in Scott Depot provided their water for free to area residents, and attempted to minimize confusion, as their systems were not impacted by the West Virginia American Water system's tap water ban.

Booth Goodwin, United States Attorney for the United States District Court for the Southern District of West Virginia commenced a formal "investigation into the circumstances surrounding the release." Goodwin stated that a "negligent release of this kind could be a criminal violation." On January 10, Kanawha County Commission President Kent Carper announced plans to ask the U.S. Chemical Safety and Hazard Investigation Board (CSB) to investigate the incident. By January 11, CSB officials began reviewing information about the spill, and said they would arrive in the Charleston area on January 13 to start their investigation. The Occupational Safety and Health Administration also opened its own investigation of the incident.

The Environmental Protection Agency had found no violations and had not taken enforcement actions against the Freedom Industries Charleston facility within the last five years. DEP did reveal that the facility had been the subject of a previous "odor complaint" "several years ago," although the complaint was determined by DEP to be unfounded. Following the spill, the DEP issued a violation notice on January 10 to Freedom Industries for releasing MCHM into the air and violating West Virginia's Air Pollution Control Act and the Water Pollution Control Act, and it subsequently ordered that its Charleston facility's 11 other tanks be emptied and the chemicals moved off site. By the night of January 9, the West Virginia National Guard began testing the contaminated water in the Elk River. The National Guard utilized its own lab, in addition to labs from DuPont and the West Virginia Department of Health and Human Resources. The National Guard requested two additional labs to expedite the water testing process. West Virginia American Water coordinated with DuPont and the United States Army Corps of Engineers to determine the contamination level within its system. A total of four labs were set up to continue testing the amount of the chemical remaining in the water.

On January 12, Governor Tomblin stated that he was coordinating with DEP secretary, Randy Huffman, to draft recommendations for preventing future chemical leaks. Because MCHM was not considered a "hazardous" chemical, Freedom Industries' Charleston facility was not inspected by the DEP. Another West Virginia regulation requiring chemical companies to provide "immediate" notice of a spill leaves it to the DEP chief to determine what "immediate" notice is on a case-by-case basis. As of January 13, West Virginia state authorities continued their investigation as to which state laws Freedom Industries broke leading up to and following the MCHM spill.

The tank that leaked showed signs it may have been damaged by water that froze during unusually cold winter weather.

On January 9, 2015, Governor Tomblin released a report detailing the state's response to the Freedom Industries chemical leak. The report provides chronological detail of each state agency and commission's role in responding to the emergency, and includes questionnaires completed by state workers directly involved in the response.

== Threat to human health ==
The chemical released was "crude MCHM," which was intended for use as a foaming/wash agent to aid in the processing of coal. Little is known about MCHM's potential effects on human health, nor about its effects on aquatic environments. While its manufacturer, Eastman Chemical Company, is required by law to produce a safety data sheet (SDS), much of the information in the data sheet is incomplete, according to a report by the Christian Science Monitor. Contaminated water smelled sweet, resembling licorice. According to the American Association of Poison Control Centers, if consumed the chemical may provoke the following symptoms: nausea, vomiting, dizziness, headaches, diarrhea, reddened/burning skin and/or eyes, itching, and rashes. The American Conference of Governmental Industrial Hygienists stated that MCHM caused headaches, eye and skin irritation, and difficulty breathing from prolonged exposures at high concentrations.

Both health and company officials have stated the chemical consumption is not known to be fatal, even if consumed in its purest form. The chemical leaked was highly diluted due to the large amount of water involved; however, due to the potential health effects, authorities advised over 300,000 residents in surrounding communities to avoid utilizing the water for cooking, drinking, or bathing. Because shipment of MCHM is not regulated by the United States Department of Transportation, it was not being considered "hazardous" by emergency response and environmental protection officials. However, under the regulatory standards of the Occupational Safety and Health Administration, MCHM is considered "hazardous." The chemical's manufacturer, Eastman Chemical Company, identified it as a "skin irritant that could be potentially harmful if ingested." The Eastman Chemical Company's material safety data sheet for crude MCHM identifies hazards, included skin and eye irritation, and at elevated temperatures, irritation of the eyes and of the respiratory tract.

The median lethal dose of MCHM is 825 milligrams per kilogram of body mass, when tested in rats.

== Environmental impact and cleanup ==
The president of West Virginia American Water stated that his company was not aware of a treatment to remove the chemical from its system. Because of this, West Virginia American Water began flushing miles of lines within its Charleston area water system, although as of January 11, there was no timetable as to when its system would be safe for area residents to use. West Virginia American Water's engineers began adding additional carbon and other chemicals to speed the treatment process and move the contaminated water out of its water distribution system.

Michael Dorsey, Chief of the DEP's Homeland Security and Emergency Response division stated that tests conducted on water samples taken on the night of January 9–10 showed the concentration of MCHM had decreased from 2 parts per million to 1.7 parts per million. That finding remained above the 1 part per million recommended by the Centers for Disease Control and Prevention as "acceptable." The West Virginia National Guard continued to test the water every hour and its teams worked overnight between January 9 and 10 to perform tests and report results on both inflow and outflow samples of the Elk River's water. Each test took approximately 46 minutes. Tests conducted over the weekend of January 11–12 at four locations indicated a safe amount below 1 part per million of the chemical. Despite this, officials continued testing throughout the water system's distribution area into January 13 before ending the system-wide "no use" advisory.

The chemical's manufacturer, Eastman Chemical Company, maintains that when MCHM is diluted, the compound does not have adverse effects on the aquatic environment. No fish kills were reported following the spill and there was no apparent effect on aquatic life, according to West Virginia state officials. As of 2008, the Elk River serves as the sole remaining habitat for the diamond darter (Crystallaria cincotta). On July 26, 2013, the United States Fish and Wildlife Service formally designated the diamond darter as an endangered species under the Endangered Species Act of 1973. The potential risk of the chemical spill to the diamond darter has not been reported.

== Resulting closures ==
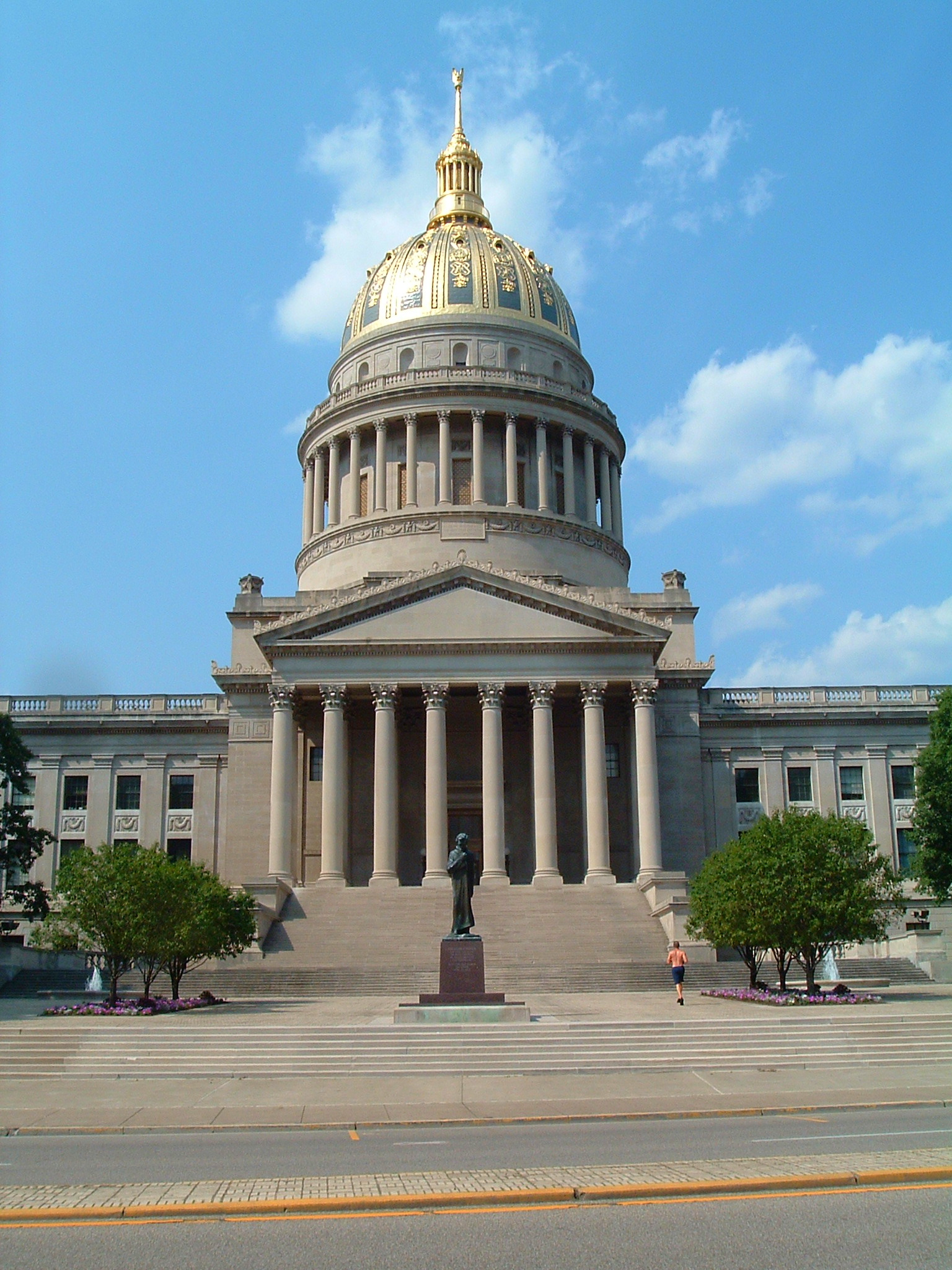
The West Virginia Legislature and the Supreme Court of Appeals of West Virginia at the West Virginia State Capitol (pictured) cancelled sessions on January 9, following the tap water ban.

As a result of West Virginia American Water's notice that the tap water was unsafe following the spill, Charleston area businesses closed and hospitals took emergency measures to conserve water. School systems within the affected eight counties were also closed. Charleston area residents hurried to nearby stores to stock up on available bottled and packaged water. The West Virginia Legislature, which had reconvened following its winter break, cancelled its business on January 9. On January 9, the Supreme Court of Appeals of West Virginia in Charleston and the courts in Boone and Lincoln counties closed. West Virginia State University in Institute also cancelled its classes for the duration of the tap water outage.

Because of the lack of potable water, Charleston cancelled a convention of mayors and city council members from around the state of West Virginia, which had been scheduled to begin on January 13.

=== Litigation ===
As of January 10, the day following the chemical spill from Freedom Industries' Charleston facility, at least eight lawsuits had been filed against the chemical company. The lawsuits were filed on behalf of Charleston area businesses forced to close during the resulting state of emergency and on behalf of all West Virginia American Water customers. The plaintiffs have asked to be granted class action status and are seeking punitive damages and compensation for lost profits during the state of emergency. A further lawsuit was filed against Freedom Industries and West Virginia American Water on January 10 by a patient whose kidney transplant was cancelled due to the water outage.

By January 13, a Kanawha County judge had granted a temporary restraining order against Freedom Industries, and the number of lawsuits filed in the Kanawha County Circuit Court had risen to 19. On January 17, 2014, Freedom Industries filed for Chapter 11 bankruptcy, requiring a court–appointed trustee to run the company.

However, according to the Charleston Gazette, a company "whose characteristics are strikingly similar to Freedom Industries," Lexycon LLC, registered as a business with the West Virginia secretary of state about two months after Freedom Industries filed for bankruptcy. The company is registered at the same addresses and phone numbers as the former Freedom Industries, and is founded by a former Freedom executive.

== Previous chemical accidents ==
Freedom Industries' release of crude MCHM into the Elk River was the third major chemical accident to occur in the Kanawha Valley in five years. In 2008, there was an explosion and fire at a Bayer CropScience facility in Institute, killing two employees. In 2010, toxic gas was released at the DuPont facility in Belle. Following these incidents, a team of expert officials from the U.S. Chemical Safety and Hazard Investigation Board (CSB) conducted investigations and contacted West Virginia state authorities in 2011 to establish a program to prevent chemical accidents and releases throughout the Kanawha River valley, known as "Chemical Valley" for its history of chemical processing, production, and resulting pollution. The CSB recommended that the safety program be headed by Dr. Rahul Gupta, the executive director for the Kanawha-Charleston Health Department. The West Virginia Legislature and West Virginia state government did not execute the CSB's recommendations.

== Outcome ==
On January 14, five days after the chemical spill, leaders in both the West Virginia House of Delegates and the West Virginia Senate began investigating the loopholes that allowed the Freedom Industries facility in Charleston not to report the incident earlier. Senator John Unger, chairman of the Joint Legislative Oversight Committee on State Water Resources, proposed amending the current State Water Resources Management Plan.

At the request of Governor Tomblin, DEP Secretary Randy Huffman began examining new methods of regulating similar chemical facilities. DEP is also examining the establishment of an inventory of similar facilities across West Virginia.

On January 15, at an event sponsored by the American Coalition for Clean Coal Electricity, West Virginia's U.S. Senator Joe Manchin, quoting the state motto "Montani semper liberi" ("Mountaineers are always free"), assured the audience he would resist any new EPA regulations introduced as a result of the chemical spill. He told interviewers the next day:

Coal and chemicals inevitably bring risk – but that doesn't mean they should be shut down. Cicero says, "To err is human." But you're going to stop living because you're afraid of making a mistake?

On February 10, the Committee on Transportation and Infrastructure, U.S. House of Representatives, held a field hearing in Charleston to investigate the circumstances behind, and the response to, the chemical spill.

== Further independent sampling ==
On January 16, an independent unfunded engineering and science research team from the University of South Alabama drove more than 800 miles from Mobile, Alabama to help residents affected by the incident. The team was headed by Environmental Engineering Professors Dr. Andrew Whelton and Kevin White, and also included graduate students Keven Kelley, Matt Connell, Jeff Gill, and Lakia McMillan. The initial focus of their effort was to determine the impact of flushing on chemical levels in household drinking water as well as understand the reaction of the contaminated water with various household plumbing materials.

When on the ground, the team found that many residents had not flushed their plumbing systems despite being given permission days before their arrival. Contaminated water remained in homeowner plumbing systems, leaving it to contact plumbing materials such as pipes, valves, gaskets, and joints. Homeowners they spoke with explained that they had refused to flush because of reports they heard from friends that odors caused by flushing could cause negative health impacts. Many homeowners stated no intention of flushing for the foreseeable future. In response, the research team modified the flushing protocol that was issued to homeowners and helped flush residences with these more health protective measures.

Dr. Whelton's team then issued new guidance to the affected homeowners on how to conduct a plumbing system flush.

On January 20, Dr. Whelton, his team, and the WV Clean Water Hub briefed the Governor Tomblin's Director of Communications about citizens not flushing after a press conference at the Capitol building. The number of residents that had not flushed their plumbing systems was unknown to the Governor's office.

Results of the unfunded research team's efforts have been reported by several news outlets, including CBS Evening News with Scott Pelley, local CBS affiliate WOWK, Charleston Daily Mail, West Virginia Water Crisis Blog, New York Times, Mobile Press-Register, and The Huffington Post. Their testing continues and focuses on the public health and plumbing system degradation issues associated with contaminated drinking water.

On December 16, 2014, the research team's completed paper regarding the residential tap water contamination in West Virginia was published in Environmental Science & Technology. It identifies specific chemicals found in residential homes and quantifies the level of contamination experienced by affected residents.

== See also ==
Major chemical spills affecting waterways

- Ajka alumina plant accident
- 2000 Baia Mare cyanide spill
- Doñana disaster
- 2012 Guangxi cadmium spill
- Sandoz chemical spill
- Tianji Coal Chemistry Industry Group chemical spill
