= 2014 Bangladesh blackout =

Power outage in Bangladesh

The 2014 Bangladesh blackout was a power outage that occurred across Bangladesh on the morning of November 2, 2014. The blackout lasted for almost 10 hours.

== Cause ==
The blackout began after a technical issue in the transmission line distributing power from India.

Bangladesh had a severe generation deficit relative to demand, and normal system operations already rationed electricity in rolling blackouts. Following a transmission line failure, Bangladesh could not increase local generation to match demand; all local generation was already in use. Nor could Bangladesh easily import power; it had no synchronous links to the much larger Indian grid. Instead, Bangladesh relied on underfrequency load shedding to temporarily increase the blackout size and stabilize the grid.

Around 11:30 pm on November 1, the (asynchronous) HVDC connection between India and Bangladesh failed, removing 444 MW of imported power. Because the event occurred late at night, the circuits attached to underfrequency relays were less heavily loaded than usual, and could not restore the nominal system 50 Hz frequency, settling at 49 Hz. The persistent disturbance then caused the system to collapse.

== Areas affected ==
Due to the blackout, electricity was cut in the capital city. Some areas affected by this power outage are Dhaka, Chittagong and Sylhet as well as other big cities and towns across the country.

== Impact ==
Shops were forced to close and due to no electricity, hospitals had to use generators but the patients still had to face difficulties as some of the equipment needed for the tests stopped working. Food in homes also spoiled due to powerless refrigerators.
