= 2-Heptanone =

- Skeletal formula of 2-heptanone

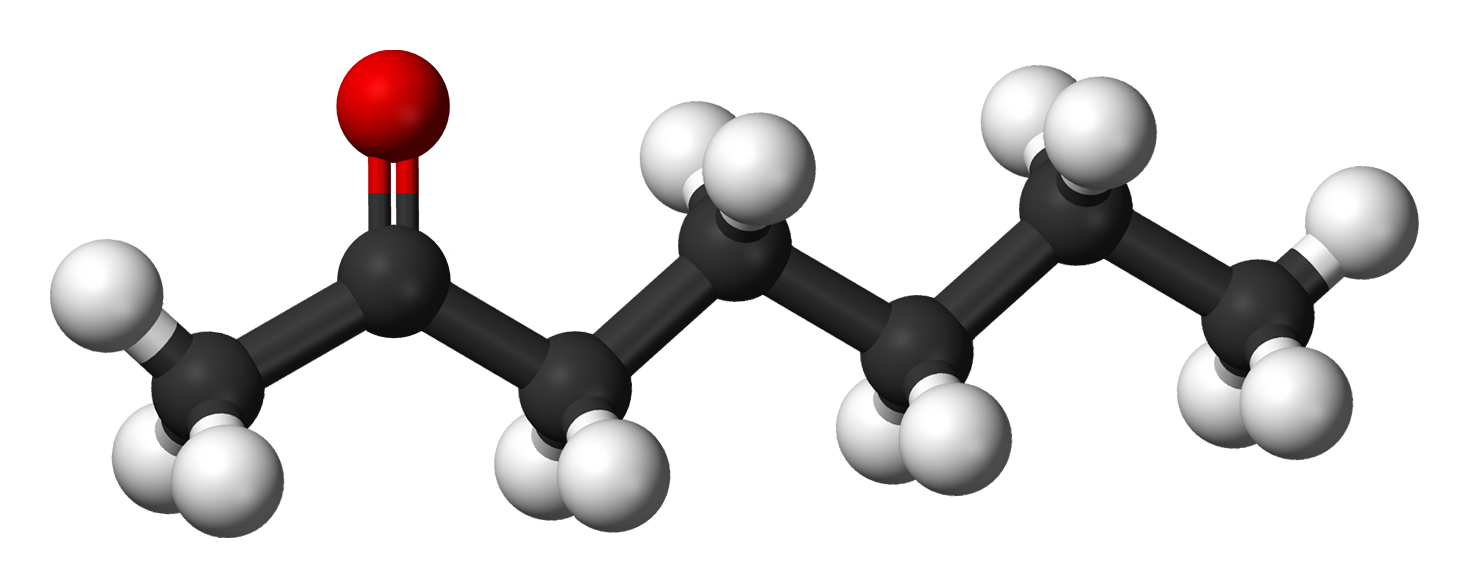
- Ball-and-stick model of 2-heptanone

Names
- Preferred IUPAC name Heptan-2-one
- Other names Amyl methyl ketone Butyl acetone Methyl n-amyl ketone Methyl pentyl ketone

Identifiers
| CAS Number | 110-43-0 |
| 3D model (JSmol) | Interactive image |
| ChEBI | CHEBI:5672 |
| ChEMBL | ChEMBL18893 |
| ChemSpider | 7760 |
| ECHA InfoCard | 100.003.426 |
| KEGG | C08380 |
| PubChem CID | 8051 |
| UNII | 89VVP1B008 |
| CompTox Dashboard (EPA) | DTXSID5021916 |
- InChI: InChI=1S/C7H14O/c1-3-4-5-6-7(2)8/h3-6H2,1-2H3 Key: CATSNJVOTSVZJV-UHFFFAOYSA-N; InChI=1/C7H14O/c1-3-4-5-6-7(2)8/h3-6H2,1-2H3 Key: CATSNJVOTSVZJV-UHFFFAOYAO
- SMILES: O=C(C)CCCCC

Properties
| Chemical formula | C_{7}H_{14}O |
| Molar mass | 114.18 g/mol |
| Appearance | Clear liquid |
| Odor | banana-like, fruity |
| Density | 0.8 g/mL |
| Melting point | −35.5 °C (−31.9 °F; 237.7 K) |
| Boiling point | 151 °C (304 °F; 424 K) |
| Solubility in water | 0.4% by wt |
| Vapor pressure | 3 mmHg (20 °C) |
| Magnetic susceptibility (χ) | −80.50·10^{−6} cm^{3}/mol |

Hazards
| Flash point | 39 °C (102 °F; 312 K) |
| Autoignition temperature | 393 °C (739 °F; 666 K) |
| Explosive limits | 1.1% at 151 °F (66 °C) - 7.9% at 250 °F (121 °C) |
- Lethal dose or concentration (LD, LC)
| LD_{50} (median dose) | 1670 mg/kg (rat, oral); 750 mg/kg (mouse, oral) |
| LC_{Lo} (lowest published) | 4000 ppm (rat, 4 hr); 2000 ppm (guinea pig, 14.8 hr) |
- NIOSH (US health exposure limits)
| PEL (Permissible) | TWA 100 ppm (465 mg/m^{3}) |
| REL (Recommended) | TWA 100 ppm (465 mg/m^{3}) |
| IDLH (Immediate danger) | 800 ppm |
- Except where otherwise noted, data are given for materials in their standard state (at 25 °C [77 °F], 100 kPa). verify (what is ?) Infobox references

2-Heptanone, also known as methyl n-amyl ketone, or heptan-2-one, is an organic compound with the molecular formula CH_{3}C(O)(CH_{2})_{4}CH_{3}. It is classified as a ketone. The compound is a colorless, water-like liquid with a banana-like, fruity odor. It contributes to the flavor or odor of several aspects of everyday life.

== Occurrence and uses ==
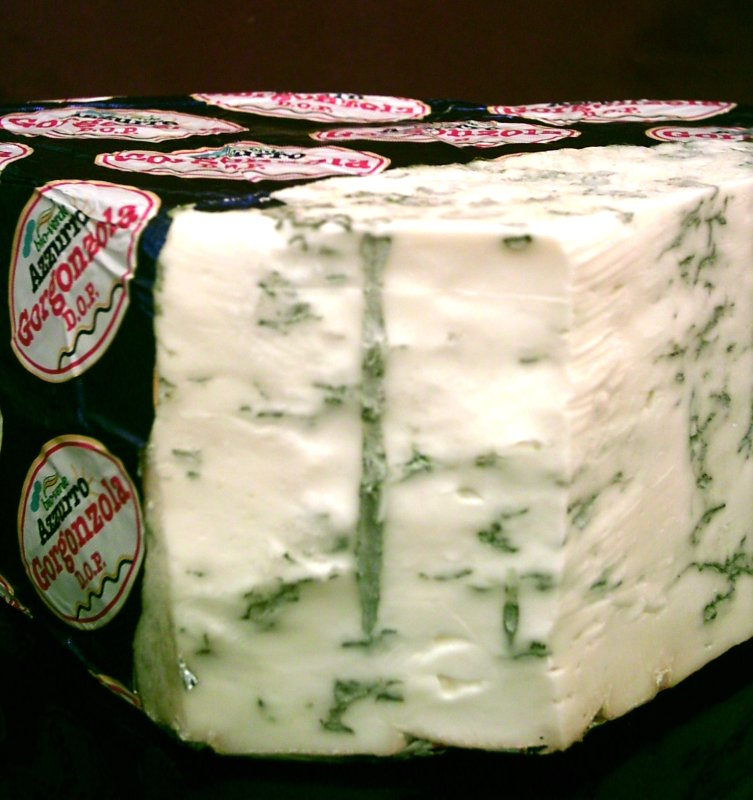
The typical odor of gorgonzola is related to 2-heptanone.

2-Heptanone is listed by the U.S. FDA as a "food additive permitted for direct addition to food for human consumption" (21 CFR 172.515), and it occurs naturally in certain foods (e.g., beer, white bread, butter, various cheeses and potato chips).

=== Odor component ===
The mechanism of action of 2-heptanone as a pheromone at odorant receptors in rodents has been investigated. 2-Heptanone is present in the urine of stressed rats and believe that it is used as a means to alert other rats. Certain species of worms are attracted to 2-heptanone and bacteria can use this as a means of pathogenesis. 2-Heptanone has also been found to be excreted by honey bees when they bite small pests within the colony such as wax moth larvae and Varroa mites. Though it was historically believed to be an alarm pheromone, 2-heptanone has been shown to act as an anaesthetic on the pests, enabling the honey bee to stun the pest and eject it from the hive. The work could lead to the use of 2-heptanone as an alternative local anaesthetic to lidocaine, which although well established for clinical use, has the disadvantage of provoking allergic reactions in some people.

It is one of several compounds that contributes to the odor of sweaty clothing.

=== Metabolite ===
2-Heptanone was one of the metabolites of n-heptane found in the urine of employees exposed to heptane in shoe and tire factories. This commonly occurs from exposure to plasticisers. 2-Heptanone can be absorbed through the skin, inhaled and consumed. Exposure to 2-Heptanone can cause irritation of skin/eyes, respiratory system, headaches, vomiting, and nausea.

In mice 2-H is a urinary component and pheromone. It has a high affinity for the main olfactory epithelium. Gaillard et al 2002 found that it agonizes one specific olfactory receptor, and that that OR only binds 2-H.

== Production ==
2-Hepthanone is produced via condensation of acetone and butyraldehyde, followed by hydrogenation of the resulting heptenone.
