= Cyclohexylmethanol =

Names
- Preferred IUPAC name Cyclohexylmethanol
- Other names Cyclohexanemethanol

Identifiers
CAS Number	100-49-2
3D model (JSmol)	Interactive image
ChemSpider	7226
ECHA InfoCard	100.002.598
PubChem CID	7507
UNII	4VDR6634UG
CompTox Dashboard (EPA)	DTXSID3059212
- InChI: InChI=1S/C7H14O/c8-6-7-4-2-1-3-5-7/h7-8H,1-6H2 Key: VSSAZBXXNIABDN-UHFFFAOYSA-N; InChI=1/C7H14O/c8-6-7-4-2-1-3-5-7/h7-8H,1-6H2 Key: VSSAZBXXNIABDN-UHFFFAOYAW
- SMILES: C1CCC(CC1)CO

Properties
Chemical formula	C_{7}H_{14}O
Molar mass	114,19 g·mol^{−1}
Appearance	colorless liquid with a smell of alcohol
Density	0,9339 g·cm^{−3}
Melting point	19 °C (66 °F)
Boiling point	187–188 °C (369–370 °F)
Solubility in water	small in water

Hazards
Flash point	71 °C (160 °F).
- Except where otherwise noted, data are given for materials in their standard state (at 25 °C [77 °F], 100 kPa). Infobox references

Cyclohexylmethanol is an organic compound with the formula C_{6}H_{11}−CH_{2}−OH. It is a cyclohexane ring functionalized with an alcohol, specifically a hydroxymethyl group. The compound is a colorless liquid, although commercial samples can appear yellow.

== Production ==
Cyclohexylmethanol can be produced in two step starting with the hydroformylation of cyclohexene. This process also give cyclohexane, resulting from hydrogenation. The resulting cyclohexanecarboxaldehyde is then hydrogenated to give the alcohol.
