= 5-Methyl-2-hexanone =

Identifiers
| CAS Number | 110-12-3 |
| 3D model (JSmol) | Interactive image |
| ChEBI | CHEBI:88432 |
| ChEMBL | ChEMBL45354 |
| ChemSpider | 7743 |
| ECHA InfoCard | 100.003.399 |
| EC Number | 203-737-8 |
| PubChem CID | 8034 |
| RTECS number | MP3850000 |
| UNII | 6O4A4A5F28 |
| UN number | 2302 (5-METHYLHEXAN-2-ONE) |
| CompTox Dashboard (EPA) | DTXSID5021914 |
- InChI: InChI=1S/C7H14O/c1-6(2)4-5-7(3)8/h6H,4-5H2,1-3H3 Key: FFWSICBKRCICMR-UHFFFAOYSA-N
- SMILES: CC(C)CCC(=O)C

Properties
| Chemical formula | C_{7}H_{14}O |
| Molar mass | 114.188 g·mol^{−1} |
| Appearance | colorless liquid |
| Density | 0.88 g/ml |
| Melting point | −41 °C (−42 °F; 232 K) |
| Boiling point | 145 °C (293 °F; 418 K) |
| Refractive index (n_{D}) | 1.4062 |

Hazards
- GHS labelling
| Pictograms | (GHS05: Corrosive) (GHS07: Exclamation mark) |
| Signal word | Warning |
| Hazard statements | H226, H332 |
| Precautionary statements | P210, P233, P240, P241, P242, P243, P261, P271, P280, P303+P361+P353, P304+P340, P317, P370+P378, P403+P235, P501 |
- Except where otherwise noted, data are given for materials in their standard state (at 25 °C [77 °F], 100 kPa). Infobox references

5-Methyl-2-hexanone, also known as methyl isoamyl ketone, is an organic compound with the molecular formula CH_{3}C(O)(CH_{2})_{2}CH(CH_{3})_{2}. It is classified as a ketone. The compound is a colorless, water-like liquid that is used as a solvent. It is produced via condensation of acetone and isobutyraldehyde followed by hydrogenation of the resulting alkene.
