= 4-Heptanone =

Names
- Preferred IUPAC name Heptan-4-one
- Other names Dipropyl ketone, Butyrone, DPK, Propyl ketone

Identifiers
CAS Number	123-19-3
3D model (JSmol)	Interactive image
ChEBI	CHEBI:89484
ChemSpider	28986
ECHA InfoCard	100.004.191
EC Number	204-608-9
PubChem CID	31246
RTECS number	MJ5600000
UNII	9BN582JQ61
UN number	2710
CompTox Dashboard (EPA)	DTXSID6047650
- InChI: InChI=1S/C7H14O/c1-3-5-7(8)6-4-2/h3-6H2,1-2H3 Key: HCFAJYNVAYBARA-UHFFFAOYSA-N
- SMILES: O=C(CCC)CCC

Properties
Chemical formula	C_{7}H_{14}O
Molar mass	114.188 g·mol^{−1}
Appearance	Colorless liquid
Density	0.82 g/mL
Melting point	−32.8 °C (−27.0 °F; 240.3 K)
Boiling point	143.9 °C (291.0 °F; 417.0 K)
Vapor pressure	5 mmHg (20 °C)
Magnetic susceptibility (χ)	−80.45·10^{−6} cm^{3}/mol

Hazards
- Occupational safety and health (OHS/OSH)
Main hazards	Combustible
- GHS labelling
Pictograms	(GHS02: Flammable) (GHS07: Exclamation mark)
Signal word	Warning
Hazard statements	H226, H332
Precautionary statements	P210, P233, P240, P241, P242, P243, P261, P271, P280, P303+P361+P353, P304+P312, P304+P340, P312, P370+P378, P403+P235, P501
NFPA 704 (fire diamond)	1 2 0
Flash point	48.9 °C (120.0 °F; 322.0 K)
- NIOSH (US health exposure limits)
PEL (Permissible)	none
REL (Recommended)	TWA 50 ppm (235 mg/m^{3})
IDLH (Immediate danger)	N.D.
- Except where otherwise noted, data are given for materials in their standard state (at 25 °C [77 °F], 100 kPa). verify (what is ?) Infobox references

4-Heptanone or heptan-4-one is an organic compound with the formula (CH_{3}CH_{2}CH_{2})_{2}CO. It is a colorless liquid.

== Synthesis ==
The compound is synthesized by ketonization, involving the pyrolysis of iron(II) butyrate.

Butyrone is used in the synthesis of 3-propylthio-4-heptanol, which has found use as a flavor augmenting or enhancing composition in foodstuffs.
