= 3-Heptanone =

- Skeletal formula of 3-Heptanone

Names
- Preferred IUPAC name Heptan-3-one
- Other names Ethyl butyl ketone 3-Oxoheptane; Butyl ethyl ketone

Identifiers
CAS Number	106-35-4
3D model (JSmol)	Interactive image
Beilstein Reference	506161
ChEBI	CHEBI:50139
ChemSpider	7514
ECHA InfoCard	100.003.081
EC Number	203-388-1
MeSH	3-Heptanone
PubChem CID	7802
RTECS number	MJ5250000
UNII	10GA6SR3AT
UN number	1224
CompTox Dashboard (EPA)	DTXSID2047438
- InChI: InChI=1S/C7H14O/c1-3-5-6-7(8)4-2/h3-6H2,1-2H3 Key: NGAZZOYFWWSOGK-UHFFFAOYSA-N
- SMILES: CCC(=O)CCCC

Properties
Chemical formula	C_{7}H_{14}O
Molar mass	114.188 g·mol^{−1}
Appearance	Colorless liquid
Odor	powerful, fruity
Density	0.812 g cm^{−3}
Melting point	−39 °C (−38 °F; 234 K)
Boiling point	146 to 149 °C (295 to 300 °F; 419 to 422 K)
Solubility in water	4.3 mg/mL (%1) (20 °C)
Vapor pressure	4 mmHg (20 °C)

Hazards
- GHS labelling
Pictograms	(GHS02: Flammable) (GHS05: Corrosive)
Signal word	Warning
Hazard statements	H226, H319, H332
Precautionary statements	P210, P233, P240, P241, P242, P243, P261, P264, P271, P280, P303+P361+P353, P304+P312, P304+P340, P305+P351+P338, P312, P337+P313, P370+P378, P403+P235, P501
Flash point	41 °C (106 °F; 314 K)
- Lethal dose or concentration (LD, LC)
LD_{50} (median dose)	2760 mg/kg (rat, oral)
- NIOSH (US health exposure limits)
PEL (Permissible)	TWA 50 ppm (230 mg/m^{3})
REL (Recommended)	TWA 50 ppm (230 mg/m^{3})
IDLH (Immediate danger)	1000 ppm
- Safety data sheet (SDS)
- Except where otherwise noted, data are given for materials in their standard state (at 25 °C [77 °F], 100 kPa). Infobox references

3-Heptanone (butyl ethyl ketone), is a seven carbon ketone. It is a colourless liquid with a "green odour," also described as having a fruity scent and a melon-banana flavour. It is often used as a perfume/fragrance, as a solvent for cellulose, nitrocellulose, or vinyl resins, and as a synthetic building block in the preparation of other organic molecules.

== Preparation ==
3-Heptanone is produced industrially through reductive condensation of propionaldehyde (propanal) with butanone (methyl ethyl ketone). This reaction yields hept-4-en-3-one, which is subsequently hydrogenated to 3-heptanone.

CH_{3}CH_{2}CHO + CH_{3}C(O)CH_{2}CH_{3} → CH_{3}CH_{2}C(O)CHCHCH_{2}CH_{3} + H_{2}O

CH_{3}CH_{2}C(O)CHCHCH_{2}CH_{3} + H_{2} → CH_{3}CH_{2}C(O)CH_{2}CH_{2}CH_{2}CH_{3}
