= Nylon (disambiguation) =

Nylon is a generic term for a class of polymers.

Nylon or Nylons may also refer to:

== Nylon polymers ==
- Nylon 66, (aka nylon 6-6, nylon 6,6 or nylon 6/6) a type of polyamide in common use
- Nylon 6, or polycaprolactam is a polymer in common use
- Nylon 11, or polyamide 11 (PA 11) is a bioplastic polyamide
- Nylon 12, a polyamide synthesized from 12-carbon monomers
- Nylon 46 (aka nylon 4–6, nylon 4/6 or nylon 4,6, PA46, Polyamide 46), a high heat resistant polyamide
- Nylon 4, or polybutyrolactam, a biodegradable nylon
- Nylon 1,6 (aka polyamide 1,6), a type of polyamide
- Nylon TMDT (also known as Nylon 6-3-T), a type of transparent nylon

== Garments and fabric ==
- Nylon stockings, held up by a suspender belt ("sussies") or top elastic
- Nylons, or pantyhose
- Nylons, or tights, a type of leggings
- Ballistic nylon, a thick, tough, nylon fabric

== Music ==
- Nylon (album), a 2005–2006 album by Anna Vissi
- Nylon (band), an Icelandic girl band
- The Nylons, a Canadian a cappella group
  - The Nylons (album), 1982

== People ==
- Judy Nylon, multidisciplinary artist
- Nylon Chen, Taiwanese singer and actor

== Firearms ==
- Remington Nylon 66, a rifle made with a non-wood stock
- Remington Nylon 76, a lever-action rifle

== Other uses ==
- Nylon (magazine), an American pop culture and fashion magazine
- NY-LON, a 2004 7-part drama series about a transatlantic romance
- NyLon (concept), the concept of an "intertwined" New York City and London, England
- Nylon Pool, an in-sea pool near Pigeon Point, Tobago
- Nylon riots, a series of store disturbances around the time of world war 2
