= OR1A2 =

Protein-coding gene in the species Homo sapiens

Identifiers
- Aliases: OR1A2, OR17-6, olfactory receptor family 1 subfamily A member 2
- External IDs: OMIM: 618047; MGI: 3030237; GeneCards: OR1A2

Gene location (Human)
Chr.	Chromosome 17 (human)
Band	17p13.3	Start	3,197,519 bp
Band	17p13.3	End	3,198,448 bp

Gene location (Mouse)
Chr.	Chromosome 11 (mouse)
Band	11|11 B5	Start	74,077,075 bp
Band	11|11 B5	End	74,089,438 bp
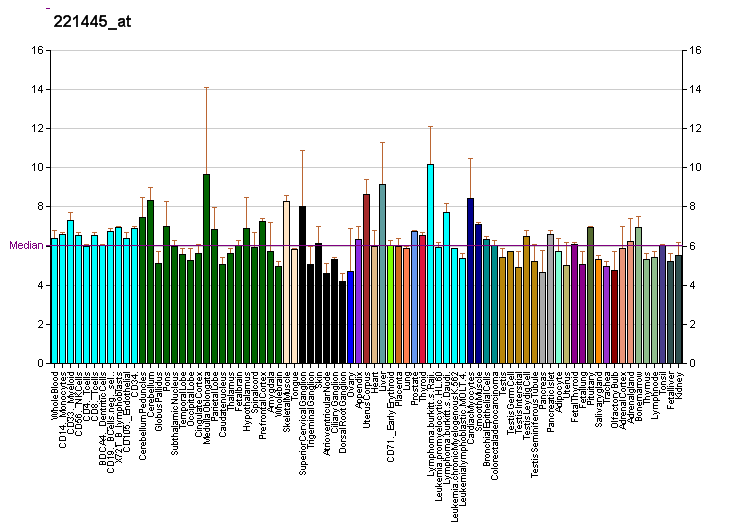
RNA expression pattern
Bgee	Human / Mouse (ortholog); Top expressed in: testicle / n/a; More reference expression data
BioGPS	More reference expression data
Gene ontology
Molecular function	G protein-coupled receptor activity; olfactory receptor activity; signal transducer activity
Cellular component	integral component of membrane; plasma membrane; membrane
Biological process	positive regulation of cytokinesis; sensory perception of smell; signal transduction; response to stimulus; detection of chemical stimulus involved in sensory perception of smell; G protein-coupled receptor signaling pathway
Sources:Amigo / QuickGO
Orthologs
Databases	NCBI: entry; OMA: entry
Species	Human	Mouse
Entrez	26189	404316
Ensembl	ENSG00000172150	ENSMUSG00000070378
UniProt	Q9Y585	Q7TRX2
RefSeq (mRNA)	NM_012352	NM_207622
RefSeq (protein)	NP_036484	NP_997505
Location (UCSC)	Chr 17: 3.2 – 3.2 Mb	Chr 11: 74.08 – 74.09 Mb
PubMed search
- Wikidata
View/Edit Human	View/Edit Mouse

Olfactory receptor 1A2 is a protein that in humans is encoded by the OR1A2 gene.

Olfactory receptors interact with odorant molecules in the nose, to initiate a neuronal response that triggers the perception of a smell. The olfactory receptor proteins are members of a large family of G-protein-coupled receptors (GPCR) arising from single coding-exon genes. Olfactory receptors share a 7-transmembrane domain structure with many neurotransmitter and hormone receptors and are responsible for the recognition and G protein-mediated transduction of odorant signals. The olfactory receptor gene family is the largest in the genome. The nomenclature assigned to the olfactory receptor genes and proteins for this organism is independent of other organisms.

== Ligands ==
The known ligands of OR1A2 are near-identical to those of OR1A1. Examples of known ligands, most of which have citrus or fruity smells:

- (S)-(−)-citronellal
- Helional
- Heptanal
- Octanal
- Nonanal (weaker than heptanal/octanal)
- Hydroxycitronellal
- Citral
- (S)-(−)-Citronellol (in contrast to OR1A1 only this enantiomer is effective; weaker than citronellal)

== See also ==
- Olfactory receptor
