= Jasminaldehyde =

Chemical compound responsible for jasmine's scent

Names
- IUPAC name (2Z)-2-benzylideneheptanal
- Other names alpha-Amyl cinnamaldehyde; alpha-Pentylcinnamaldehyde; Jasmonal

Identifiers
CAS Number	101365-33-7
3D model (JSmol)	Interactive image
ChEBI	CHEBI:32318
ChEMBL	ChEMBL1611291
ChemSpider	1361549
DrugBank	DB14175
ECHA InfoCard	100.004.129
EC Number	204-541-5
KEGG	C12288
PubChem CID	1712058
UNII	06T2G22P2C
CompTox Dashboard (EPA)	DTXSID8029157
- InChI: InChI=1S/C14H18O/c1-2-3-5-10-14(12-15)11-13-8-6-4-7-9-13/h4,6-9,11-12H,2-3,5,10H2,1H3/b14-11- Key: HMKKIXGYKWDQSV-KAMYIIQDSA-N
- SMILES: CCCCC/C(=C/C1=CC=CC=C1)/C=O

Properties
Density	0.971 g/cm^{3}
Boiling point	287.2 °C

Hazards
- GHS labelling
Pictograms	(GHS07: Exclamation mark) (GHS09: Environmental hazard)
Signal word	Warning
Hazard statements	H317, H411
Precautionary statements	P261, P272, P273, P280, P302+P352, P321, P333+P313, P363, P391, P501
- Except where otherwise noted, data are given for materials in their standard state (at 25 °C [77 °F], 100 kPa). Infobox references

Jasminaldehyde (also known as jasmine aldehyde and α-pentylcinnamaldehyde) is a fine chemical used as an aroma compound in perfumes. It is responsible for jasmine's characteristic scent.

== Synthesis ==
Jasminaldehyde used in industry is commonly derived not from jasmine essential oil, but ultimately from the castor bean plant. The process starts with ricinoleic acid, the principal constituent of castor oil. This compound undergoes cracking to undecylenic acid (used mainly to produce Nylon 11) and heptanal. The heptanal, once distilled, is then reacted with benzaldehyde in the presence of a basic catalyst (trans-aldol condensation) to give jasminaldehyde and water. The foul-smelling 2-pentylnon-2-enal is an unwanted byproduct that results from the self-condensation of heptanal. This process parallels the preparation hexyl cinnamaldehyde from octanal and benzaldehyde.
