= OR1A1 =

Protein-coding gene in the species Homo sapiens

Identifiers
- Aliases: OR1A1, OR17-7, olfactory receptor family 1 subfamily A member 1, olfactory receptor family 1 subfamily A member 1 (gene/pseudogene)
- External IDs: OMIM: 618046; MGI: 1333770; GeneCards: OR1A1

Gene location (Human)
Chr.	Chromosome 17 (human)
Band	17p13.3	Start	3,207,539 bp
Band	17p13.3	End	3,218,896 bp

Gene location (Mouse)
Chr.	Chromosome 11 (mouse)
Band	11|11 B5	Start	74,096,490 bp
Band	11|11 B5	End	74,102,205 bp
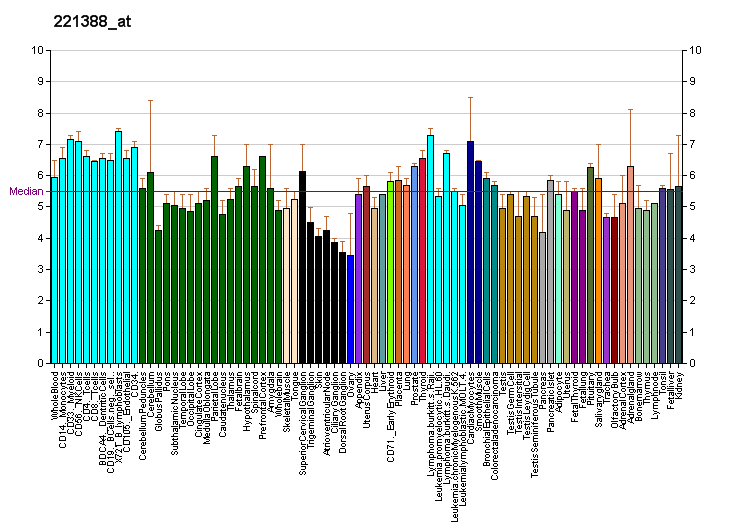
RNA expression pattern
Bgee	Human / Mouse (ortholog); Top expressed in: testicle / n/a; More reference expression data
BioGPS	More reference expression data
Gene ontology
Molecular function	signal transducer activity; olfactory receptor activity; G protein-coupled receptor activity
Cellular component	plasma membrane; membrane; integral component of membrane
Biological process	sensory perception of smell; signal transduction; response to stimulus; detection of chemical stimulus involved in sensory perception of smell; G protein-coupled receptor signaling pathway
Sources:Amigo / QuickGO
Orthologs
Databases	NCBI: entry; OMA: entry
Species	Human	Mouse
Entrez	8383	258706
Ensembl	ENSG00000172146	ENSMUSG00000070377
UniProt	Q9P1Q5	n/a
RefSeq (mRNA)	NM_014565; NM_001386104	NM_146711
RefSeq (protein)	NP_055380	n/a
Location (UCSC)	Chr 17: 3.21 – 3.22 Mb	Chr 11: 74.1 – 74.1 Mb
PubMed search
- Wikidata
View/Edit Human	View/Edit Mouse

Olfactory receptor 1A1 is a protein that in humans is encoded by the OR1A1 gene.

Olfactory receptors interact with odorant molecules in the nose, to initiate a neuronal response that triggers the perception of a smell. The olfactory receptor proteins are members of a large family of G-protein-coupled receptors (GPCR) arising from single coding-exon genes. Olfactory receptors share a 7-transmembrane domain structure with many neurotransmitter and hormone receptors and are responsible for the recognition and G protein-mediated transduction of odorant signals. The olfactory receptor gene family is the largest in the genome.

== Ligands ==
OR1A1 is relatively broadly tuned, meaning it responds to a relatively wide variety of different odor molecules. Examples of known ligands, most of which have citrus or fruity smells:

- (S)-(−)-citronellal
- Helional
- Heptanal
- Octanal
- Nonanal (weaker than heptanal/octanal)
- Hydroxycitronellal
- Citral
- Citronellol (both enantiomers, weaker than citronellal)
- Dihydrojasmone
- Thiols

== See also ==
- Olfactory receptor
