= Nylon =

Early synthetic polymer developed as a textile fiber

- Nylon 6 (top) and Nylon 6,6 (bottom)

Physical properties
- Density (ρ): 1.15 g/cm^{3}

Thermal properties
- Melting temperature (T_{m}): 463–624 K (190–351 °C)
- Thermal conductivity (k): 0.25 W/(m·K)

Nylon is a family of synthetic polymers characterized by amide linkages, typically connecting aliphatic or semi-aromatic groups.

Nylons are generally brownish in color and can possess a soft texture, with some varieties exhibiting a silk-like appearance. As thermoplastics, nylons can be melt-processed into fibers, films, and diverse shapes. The properties of nylons are often modified by blending with a variety of additives.

Numerous types of nylon are available. One family, designated nylon-XY, is derived from diamines and dicarboxylic acids of carbon chain lengths X and Y, respectively. An important example is nylon-6,6 ((−C(O)(CH_{2})_{4}C(O)−NH(CH_{2})_{6}NH−)_{n}). Another family, designated nylon-Z, is derived from aminocarboxylic acids with carbon chain length Z. An example is nylon-[6].

Nylon polymers have extensive commercial applications, including uses in textiles and fibers (such as apparel, flooring and rubber reinforcement), molded components for automotive and electrical equipment, and films (mostly for food packaging).

== History ==
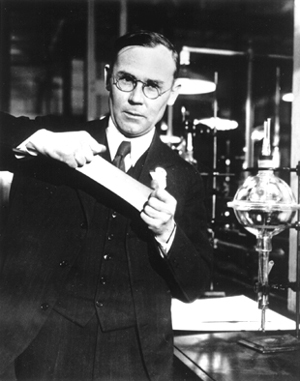
Wallace Carothers

=== DuPont and the invention of nylon ===
Researchers at DuPont began developing cellulose-based fibers, culminating in the synthetic fiber rayon. DuPont's experience with rayon was an important precursor to its development and marketing of nylon.

DuPont's invention of nylon spanned an eleven-year period, ranging from the initial research program in polymers in 1927 to its announcement in 1938, shortly before the opening of the 1939 New York World's Fair. The project grew from a new organizational structure at DuPont, suggested by Charles Stine in 1927, in which the chemical department would be composed of several small research teams that would focus on "pioneering research" in chemistry and would "lead to practical applications". Harvard instructor Wallace Hume Carothers was hired to direct the polymer research group. Initially he was allowed to focus on pure research, building on and testing the theories of German chemist Hermann Staudinger. He was very successful, as research he undertook greatly improved the knowledge of polymers and contributed to the science.

Nylon was the first commercially successful synthetic thermoplastic polymer. DuPont began its research project in 1927. The first nylon, nylon 66, was synthesized on February 28, 1935, by Wallace Hume Carothers at DuPont's research facility at the DuPont Experimental Station. In response to Carothers' work, Paul Schlack at IG Farben developed nylon 6, a different molecule based on caprolactam, on January 29, 1938.

In the spring of 1930, Carothers and his team had already synthesized two new polymers. The first was neoprene, a synthetic rubber widely used during World War II. The second was an elastic paste that became very strong upon cooling; this would later become nylon. After these discoveries, Carothers' team was made to shift its research from a more pure research approach investigating general polymerization to a more practically focused goal of finding "one chemical combination that would lend itself to industrial applications".

It was not until the beginning of 1935 that a polymer called "polymer 6-6" was finally produced. Carothers' coworker, Washington University alumnus Julian W. Hill had used a cold drawing method to produce a polyester in 1930. This cold drawing method was later used by Carothers in 1935 to fully develop nylon. The first example of nylon (nylon 6.6) was produced on February 28, 1935, at DuPont's research facility at the DuPont Experimental Station. It had all the desired properties of elasticity and strength. However, it also required a complex manufacturing process that would become the basis of industrial production in the future. DuPont obtained a patent for the polymer in September 1938, and quickly achieved a monopoly of the fiber. Carothers died 16 months before the announcement of nylon, therefore he was never able to see his success. The name "Nylon" came from the modification of norun (no run) into a unique name that could be used to market the product but was not trademarked.

Nylon was first used commercially in a nylon-bristled toothbrush in 1938, followed more famously in women's stockings or "nylons" which were shown at the 1939 New York World's Fair and first sold commercially in 1940, whereupon they became an instant commercial success with 64 million pairs sold during their first year on the market. During World War II, almost all nylon production was diverted to the military for use in parachutes and parachute cord. Wartime uses of nylon and other plastics greatly increased the market for the new materials.

The production of nylon required interdepartmental collaboration between three departments at DuPont: the Department of Chemical Research, the Ammonia Department, and the Department of Rayon. Some of the key ingredients of nylon had to be produced using high pressure chemistry, the main area of expertise of the Ammonia Department. Nylon was considered a "godsend to the Ammonia Department", which had been in financial difficulties. The reactants of nylon soon constituted half of the Ammonia Department's sales and helped them come out of the period of the Great Depression by creating jobs and revenue at DuPont.

DuPont's nylon project demonstrated the importance of chemical engineering in industry, helped create jobs, and furthered the advancement of chemical engineering techniques. In fact, it developed a chemical plant that provided 1800 jobs and used the latest technologies of the time, which are still used as a model for chemical plants today. The ability to acquire a large number of chemists and engineers quickly was a huge contribution to the success of DuPont's nylon project. The first nylon plant was located at Seaford, Delaware, beginning commercial production on December 15, 1939. On October 26, 1995, the Seaford plant was designated a National Historic Chemical Landmark by the American Chemical Society.

=== Early marketing strategies ===
An important part of nylon's popularity stems from DuPont's marketing strategy. DuPont promoted the fiber to increase demand before the product was available to the general market. Nylon's commercial announcement occurred on October 27, 1938, at the final session of the Herald Tribune's yearly "Forum on Current Problems", on the site of the approaching New York City world's fair. The "first man-made organic textile fibre" which was derived from "coal, water and air" and promised to be "as strong as steel, as fine as the spider's web" was received enthusiastically by the audience, many of them middle-class women, and made the headlines of most newspapers. Nylon was introduced as part of "The world of tomorrow" at the 1939 New York World's Fair and was featured at DuPont's "Wonder World of Chemistry" at the Golden Gate International Exposition in San Francisco in 1939. Actual nylon stockings were not shipped to selected stores in the national market until May 15, 1940. However, a limited number were released for sale in Delaware before that. The first public sale of nylon stockings occurred on October 24, 1939, in Wilmington, Delaware. 4,000 pairs of stockings were available, all of which were sold within three hours.

Another added bonus to the campaign was that it meant reducing silk imports from Japan, an argument that won over many wary customers. Nylon was even mentioned by President Roosevelt's cabinet, which addressed its "vast and interesting economic possibilities" five days after the material was formally announced.

However, the early excitement over nylon also caused problems. It fueled unreasonable expectations that nylon would be better than silk, a miracle fabric as strong as steel that would last forever and never run. Realizing the danger of claims such as "New Hosiery Held Strong as Steel" and "No More Runs", DuPont scaled back the terms of the original announcement, especially those stating that nylon would possess the strength of steel.

Also, DuPont executives marketing nylon as a revolutionary man-made material did not at first realize that some consumers experienced a sense of unease and distrust, even fear, towards synthetic fabrics. A particularly damaging news story, drawing on DuPont's 1938 patent for the new polymer, suggested that one method of producing nylon might be to use cadaverine (pentamethylenediamine), (Note: Actually the most common nylon polymers are made from hexamethylenediamine, with one more CH_{2} group than cadaverine.) a chemical extracted from corpses. Although scientists asserted that cadaverine was also extracted by heating coal, the public often refused to listen. A woman confronted one of the lead scientists at DuPont and refused to accept that the rumour was not true.

DuPont changed its campaign strategy, emphasizing that nylon was made from "coal, air and water", and started focusing on the personal and aesthetic aspects of nylon, rather than its intrinsic qualities. Nylon was thus domesticated, and attention shifted to the material and consumer aspect of the fiber with slogans like "If it's nylon, it's prettier, and oh! How fast it dries!".

=== Production of nylon fabric ===
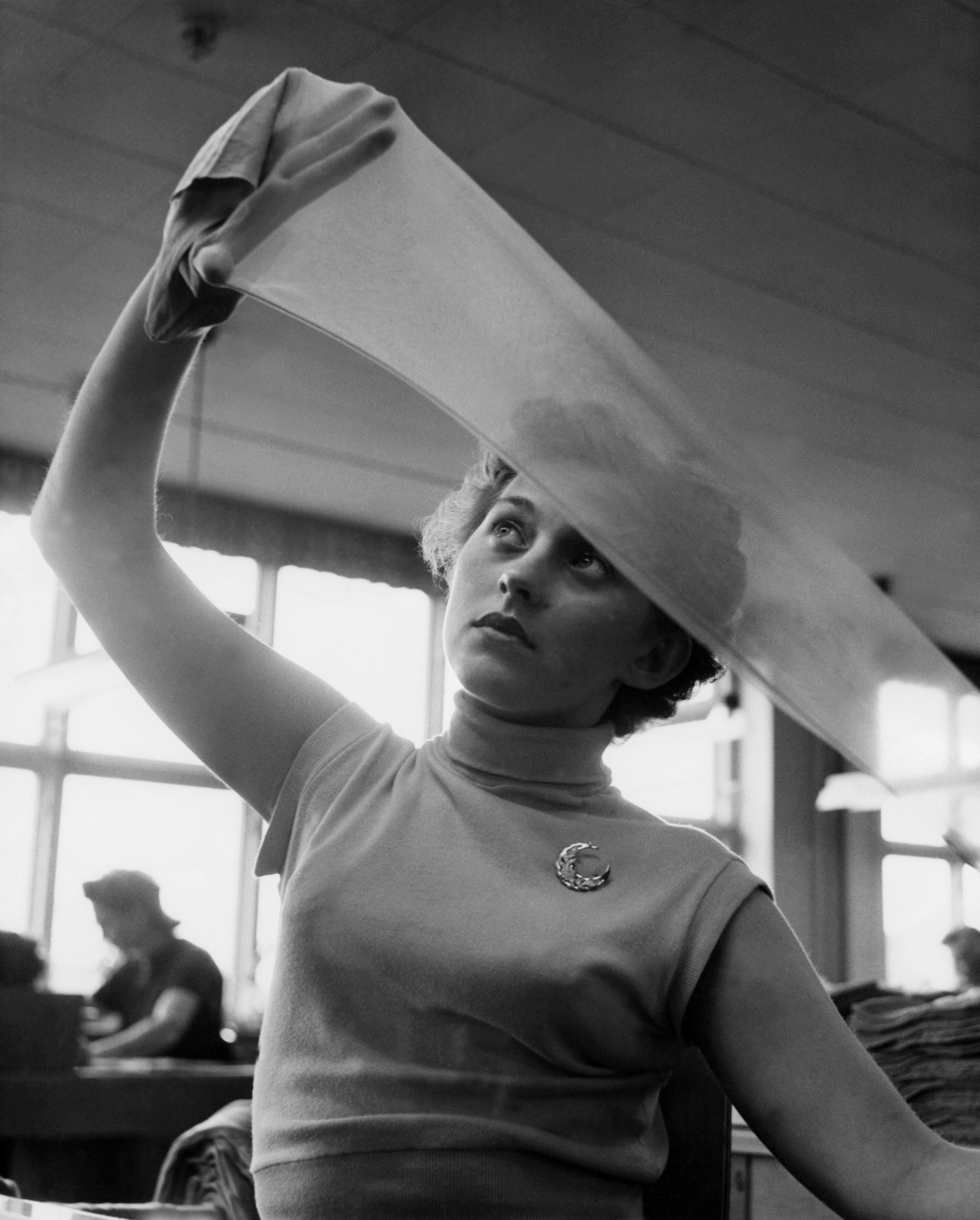
Nylon stockings being inspected in Malmö, Sweden, in 1954

After nylon's nationwide release in 1940, production was increased. 1300 tons of the fabric were produced during 1940. During their first year on the market, 64 million pairs of nylon stockings were sold. In 1941, a second plant was opened in Martinsville, Virginia, due to the success of the fabric.

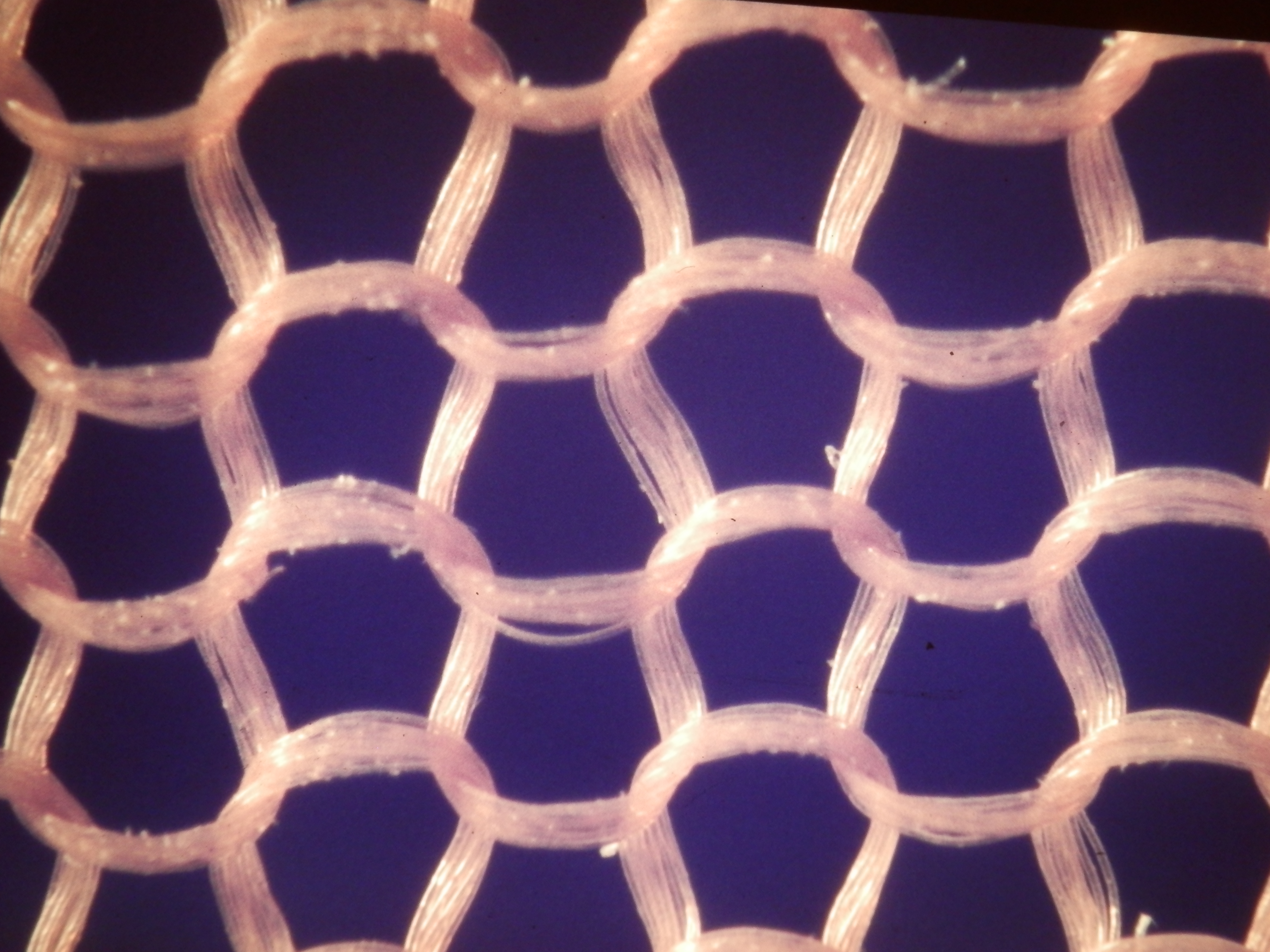
Close-up photograph of the knitted nylon fabric used in stockings

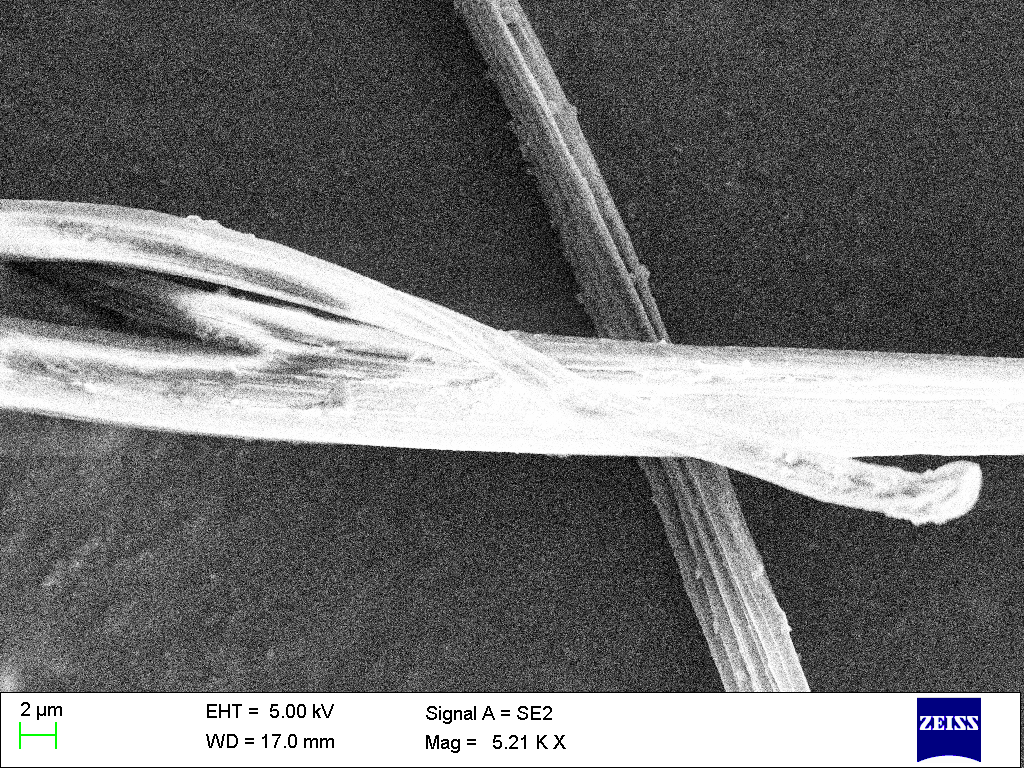
Nylon fibers visualized using scanning electron microscopy

While nylon was marketed as the durable and indestructible material of the people, it was sold at about one-and-a-half times the price of silk stockings ($4.27 per pound of nylon versus $2.79 per pound of silk). Sales of nylon stockings were strong in part due to changes in women's fashion. As Lauren Olds explains: "by 1939 [hemlines] had inched back up to the knee, closing the decade just as it started off". The shorter skirts were accompanied by a demand for stockings that offered fuller coverage without the use of garters to hold them up.

However, as of February 11, 1942, nylon production was redirected from being a consumer material to one used by the military. DuPont's production of nylon stockings and other lingerie stopped, and most manufactured nylon was used to make parachutes and tents for World War II. Although nylon stockings already made before the war could be purchased, they were generally sold on the black market for as high as $20.

Once the war ended, the return of nylon was awaited with great anticipation. Although DuPont projected yearly production of 360 million pairs of stockings, there were delays in converting back to consumer rather than wartime production. In 1946, the demand for nylon stockings could not be satisfied, which led to the nylon riots. In one instance, an estimated 40,000 people lined up in Pittsburgh to buy 13,000 pairs of nylons. In the meantime, women cut up nylon tents and parachutes left from the war in order to make blouses and wedding dresses. Between the end of the war and 1952, production of stockings and lingerie used 80% of the world's nylon. DuPont put focus on catering to the civilian demand, and continually expanded its production.

=== Introduction of nylon blends ===
As pure nylon hosiery was sold in a wider market, problems became apparent. Nylon stockings were found to be fragile, in the sense that the thread often tended to unravel lengthwise, creating 'runs'. People also reported that pure nylon textiles could be uncomfortable due to nylon's lack of absorbency. Moisture stayed inside the fabric near the skin under hot or moist conditions instead of being "wicked" away. Nylon fabric could also be itchy and tended to cling and sometimes spark as a result of static electrical charge built up by friction. Also, under some conditions, nylon could degrade, perforating or shredding stockings. Scientists explained this as acid hydrolysis resulting from air pollution, attributing it to London smog in 1952, as well as poor air quality in New York and Los Angeles.

The solution found to problems with pure nylon fabric was to blend nylon with other existing fibers or polymers such as cotton, polyester, and spandex. This led to the development of a wide array of blended fabrics. The new nylon blends retained the desirable properties of nylon (elasticity, durability, ability to be dyed) and kept clothes prices low and affordable. As of 1950, the New York Quartermaster Procurement Agency (NYQMPA), which developed and tested textiles for the Army and Navy, had committed to developing a wool-nylon blend. They were not the only ones to introduce blends of both natural and synthetic fibers. America's Textile Reporter referred to 1951 as the "Year of the blending of the fibres". Fabric blends included mixes like "Bunara" (wool-rabbit-nylon) and "Casmet" (wool-nylon-fur). In Britain, in November 1951, the inaugural address of the 198th session of the Royal Society for the Encouragement of Arts, Manufactures and Commerce focused on the blending of textiles.

DuPont's Fabric Development Department cleverly targeted French fashion designers, supplying them with fabric samples. In 1955, designers such as Coco Chanel, Jean Patou, and Christian Dior showed gowns created with DuPont fibers, and fashion photographer Horst P. Horst was hired to document their use of DuPont fabrics. American Fabrics credited blends with providing "creative possibilities and new ideas for fashions which had been hitherto undreamed of."

=== Etymology ===
DuPont went through an extensive process to generate names for its new product. In 1940, John W. Eckelberry of DuPont stated that the letters "nyl" were arbitrary, and the "on" was copied from the suffixes of other fibers such as cotton and rayon. A later publication by DuPont (Context, vol. 7, no. 2, 1978) explained that the name was originally intended to be "No-Run" ("run" meaning "unravel") but was modified to avoid making such an unjustified claim. Since the products were not really run-proof, the vowels were swapped to produce "nuron", which was changed to "nilon" "to make it sound less like a nerve tonic". For clarity in pronunciation, the "i" was changed to "y".

A persistent urban legend exists that the name is derived from "New York" and "London"; however, no organization in London was ever involved in the research and production of nylon.

=== Longer-term popularity ===
Nylon’s popularity soared in the 1940s and 1950s due to its durability and sheerness. In the 1970s, it became more popular due to its flexibility and price.

In spite of oil shortages in the 1970s, consumption of nylon textiles continued to grow by 7.5% per year between the 1960s and 1980s. Overall production of synthetic fibers, however, dropped from 63% of the worlds textile production in 1965, to 45% of the world's textile production in early 1970s. The appeal of "new" technologies wore off, and nylon fabric "was going out of style in the 1970s". Also, consumers became concerned about environmental costs throughout the production cycle: obtaining the raw materials (oil), energy use during production, waste produced during creation of the fiber, and eventual waste disposal of materials that were not biodegradable. Synthetic fibers have not dominated the market since the 1950s and 1960s. As of 2020, the worldwide production of nylon is estimated at 8.9 million tons.

Although pure nylon has many flaws and is now rarely used, its derivatives have greatly influenced and contributed to society. From scientific discoveries relating to the production of plastics and polymerization, to economic impact during the depression and the changing of women's fashion, nylon was a revolutionary product. The Lunar Flag Assembly, the first flag planted on the moon in a symbolic gesture of celebration, was made of nylon. The flag itself cost $5.50 but had to have a specially designed flagpole with a horizontal bar so that it would appear to "fly". One historian describes nylon as "an object of desire", comparing the invention to Coca-Cola in the eyes of 20th century consumers.

== Chemistry ==
External videos
- "Making Nylon", Bob Burk, CHEM 1000, Carleton University, Ottawa, Canada
- "Making Nylon 6,6"
- "Nylon production", Royal Society of Chemistry
- "Nylon and Rayon Manufacture 1949", Encyclopedia Britannica Films

In common usage, the prefix "PA" (polyamide) or the name "Nylon" are used interchangeably and are equivalent in meaning.

The nomenclature used for nylon polymers was devised during the synthesis of the first simple aliphatic nylons and uses numbers to describe the number of carbons in each monomer unit, including the carbon(s) of the carboxylic acid(s). Subsequent use of cyclic and aromatic monomers required the use of letters or sets of letters. One number after "PA" or "Nylon" indicates a homopolymer which is monadic or based on one amino acid (minus H_{2}O) as monomer:

PA 6 or Nylon 6: [NH−(CH_{2})_{5}−CO]_{n} made from ε-caprolactam.

Two numbers or sets of letters indicate a dyadic homopolymer formed from two monomers: one diamine and one dicarboxylic acid. The first number indicates the number of carbons in the diamine. The two numbers should be separated by a comma for clarity, but the comma is often omitted.

PA or Nylon 6,10 (or 610): [NH−(CH_{2})_{6}−NH−CO−(CH_{2})_{8}−CO]_{n} made from hexamethylenediamine and sebacic acid;

For copolymers the comonomers or pairs of comonomers are separated by slashes:

PA 6/66: [NH−(CH_{2})_{6}−NH−CO−(CH_{2})_{4}−CO]_{n}−[NH−(CH_{2})_{5}−CO]_{m} made from caprolactam, hexamethylenediamine and adipic acid;
PA 66/610: [NH−(CH_{2})_{6}−NH−CO−(CH_{2})_{4}−CO]_{n}−[NH−(CH_{2})_{6}−NH−CO−(CH_{2})_{8}−CO]_{m} made from hexamethylenediamine, adipic acid and sebacic acid.

The term polyphthalamide (abbreviated to PPA) is used when 60% or more moles of the carboxylic acid portion of the repeating unit in the polymer chain is composed of a combination of terephthalic acid (TPA) and isophthalic acid (IPA).

== Types ==
=== Nylon 66 and related heteropolymers ===
Nylon 66 and related polyamides are condensation polymers forms from equal parts of diamine and dicarboxylic acids. In the first case, the "repeating unit" has the ABAB structure, as also seen in many polyesters and polyurethanes. Since each monomer in this copolymer has the same reactive group on both ends, the direction of the amide bond reverses between each monomer, unlike natural polyamide proteins, which have overall directionality: C terminal → N terminal. In the second case (so called AA), the repeating unit corresponds to the single monomer.

Wallace Carothers at DuPont patented nylon 66. In the case of nylons that involve reaction of a diamine and a dicarboxylic acid, it is difficult to get the proportions exactly correct, and deviations can lead to chain termination at molecular weights less than a desirable 10,000 daltons. To overcome this problem, a crystalline, solid "nylon salt" can be formed at room temperature, using an exact 1:1 ratio of the acid and the base to neutralize each other. The salt is crystallized to purify it and obtain the desired precise stoichiometry. Heated to 285 °C (545 °F), the salt reacts to form nylon polymer with the production of water.

Nylon 510, made from pentamethylene diamine and sebacic acid, was included in the Carothers patent to nylon 66 Nylon 610 is produced similarly using hexamethylene diamine. These materials are more expensive because of the relatively high cost of sebacic acid. Owing to the high hydrocarbon content, nylon 610 is more hydrophobic and finds applications suited for this property, such as bristles.

Commercial heteropolymer polyamides
	1,4-diaminobutane	1,5-diaminopentane	MPMD	HMD	MXDA	Nonanediamine	Decanediamine	Dodecanediamine	Bis(para-aminocyclohexyl)methane	Trimethylhexamethylenediamine
Adipic acid	46		D6	66	MXD6					
Sebacic acid	410	510		610			1010			
Dodecanedioic acid				612				1212	PACM12	
Terephthalic acid	4T		DT	6T		9T	10T	12T		TMDT
Isophthalic acid			DI	6I						

Examples of these polymers that are or were commercially available:

- PA46 DSM Stanyl
- PA410 DSM Ecopaxx
- PA4T DSM Four Tii
- PA66 DuPont Zytel

=== Nylon 6 and related homopolymers ===
Homopolymers are derived from one monomer. These polymers are made from a lactam or amino acid. The synthetic route using lactams (cyclic amides) was developed by Paul Schlack at IG Farben, leading to nylon 6, or polycaprolactam—formed by a ring-opening polymerization. The peptide bond within the caprolactam is broken with the exposed active groups on each side being incorporated into two new bonds as the monomer becomes part of the polymer backbone.

The 220 °C (428 °F) melting point of nylon 6 is lower than the 265 °C (509 °F) melting point of nylon 66.

Monomer	Polymer
Caprolactam	6
11-aminoundecanoic acid	11
ω-aminolauric acid	12

Examples of these polymers that are or were commercially available:

- PA6 Lanxess Durethan B
- PA11 Arkema Rilsan
- PA12 Evonik Vestamid L

=== Nylon 1,6 ===
Nylons can also be synthesized from dinitriles using acid catalysis. For example, this method is applicable for preparation of nylon 1,6 from adiponitrile, formaldehyde and water. Additionally, nylons can be synthesized from diols and dinitriles using this method as well.

=== Copolymers ===
It is easy to make mixtures of the monomers or sets of monomers used to make nylons to obtain copolymers. This lowers crystallinity and can therefore lower the melting point.

Some copolymers that have been or are commercially available are listed below:

- PA6/66 DuPont Zytel
- PA6/6T BASF Ultramid T (6/6T copolymer)
- PA6I/6T DuPont Selar PA
- PA66/6T DuPont Zytel HTN
- PA12/MACMI EMS Grilamid TR

=== Blends ===
Most nylon polymers are miscible with each other allowing a range of blends to be made. The two polymers can react with one another by transamidation to form random copolymers.

=== Crystallinity ===
According to their crystallinity, polyamides can be:

- semi-crystalline:
  - high crystallinity: PA46 and PA66;
  - low crystallinity: PAMXD6 made from m-xylylenediamine and adipic acid;
- amorphous: PA6I made from hexamethylenediamine and isophthalic acid.

According to this classification, PA66, for example, is an aliphatic semi-crystalline homopolyamide.

== Environmental impact ==
The general chemical reaction involving hydrolysis of an amide to form a carboxylic acid and an amine

=== GHG footprint ===
The average greenhouse gas footprint of nylon in manufacturing carpets is estimated at 5.43 kg CO_{2} equivalent per kg, when produced in Europe. This gives it almost the same carbon footprint as wool, but with greater durability and therefore a lower overall carbon footprint.

Data published by PlasticsEurope indicates for nylon 66 a greenhouse gas footprint of 6.4 kg CO_{2} equivalent per kg, and an energy consumption of 138 kJ/kg. When considering the environmental impact of nylon, it is important to consider the use phase.

=== Combustion ===
Combustion of nylons closely resembles the combustion of proteins, e.g. silk. Only traces of hydrogen cyanide are formed upon incinerating.

=== Recycling ===
Nylons is typically used in durable goods, so it makes only a minor contribution to waste streams. Nylons are susceptible to hydrolysis, but the process is slow at room temperature and neutral pH, hence the utility of these materials. Being a robust polymer, nylon resin waste is not often recycled. The rate of hydrolysis increases in the presence of strong acids, a reaction essentially the reverse of their synthesis.

Nylons are also the most popular fiber type in the residential carpet industry today. The US EPA estimates that 9.2% of carpet fiber, backing and padding was recycled in 2018, 17.8% was incinerated in waste-to-energy facilities, and 73% was discarded in landfills.

Discarded nylon fishing gear such as fishing nets contributes to debris in the ocean.

Its production however can use a closed loop during manufacturing, by grinding sprues and runners and mixing them with the virgin granules being consumed by the molding machine. The process of recycling post-consumer nylon waste is expensive and difficult, so few companies utilize it, favoring cheaper newly made plastics for their products instead. US clothing company Patagonia has sold products containing recycled nylon and in the mid-2010s invested in Bureo, a company that recycles nylon from used fishing nets to make sunglasses and skateboards. The Italian company Aquafil has also recycled nylon from fishing nets, to create apparel. Vanden Recycling recycles nylon and other polyamides (PA) and has operations in the UK, Australia, Hong Kong, the UAE, Turkey and Finland. Shaw Industries, one of the world's largest carpet manufacturers, has been noted for their commitment to "cradle to cradle" sustainability, with programs for reclamation of end-of-use flooring and a focus on products which are designed to be recyclable.

In the 2010s and 2020s, societal awareness of widespread microplastic pollution and its adverse impacts on human health and wildlife (especially aquatic and marine) increased. A significant contributing factor is how long most plastics, including nylons, take to fully degrade to component chemicals in the natural environment (anywhere from decades to millennia), while being prone to fragmenting into smaller particles which cannot easily be removed from ecosystems.

== Properties ==
Above their melting temperatures, T_{m}, thermoplastics like nylon are amorphous solids or viscous fluids in which the chains approximate random coils. Below T_{m}, amorphous regions alternate with regions which are lamellar crystals. The amorphous regions contribute elasticity, and the crystalline regions contribute strength and rigidity. The planar amide (-CO-NH-) groups are very polar, so nylon forms multiple hydrogen bonds among adjacent strands. Because the nylon backbone is so regular and symmetrical, especially if all the amide bonds are in the trans configuration, nylons often have high crystallinity and make excellent fibers. The amount of crystallinity depends on the details of formation, as well as on the kind of nylon.

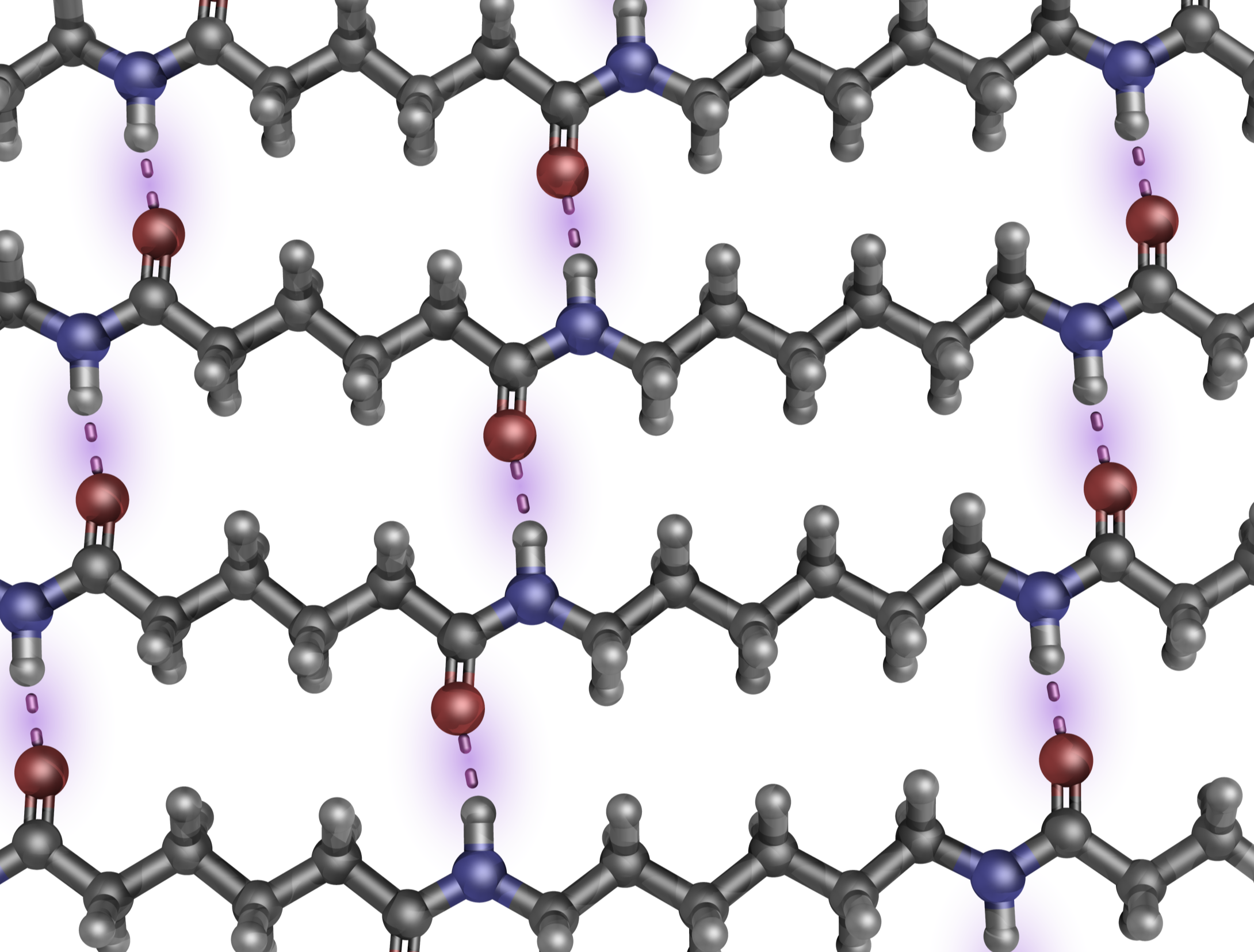
Hydrogen bonding in Nylon 66 (in mauve)

Nylon 66 can have multiple parallel strands aligned with their neighboring peptide bonds at coordinated separations of exactly six and four carbons for considerable lengths, so the carbonyl oxygens and amide hydrogens can line up to form interchain hydrogen bonds repeatedly, without interruption (see the figure opposite). Nylon 510 can have coordinated runs of five and eight carbons. Thus parallel (but not antiparallel) strands can participate in extended, unbroken, multi-chain β-pleated sheets, a strong and tough supermolecular structure similar to that found in natural silk fibroin and the β-keratins in feathers. (Proteins have only an amino acid α-carbon separating sequential -CO-NH- groups.) Nylon 6 will form uninterrupted H-bonded sheets with mixed directionalities, but the β-sheet wrinkling is somewhat different. The three-dimensional disposition of each alkane hydrocarbon chain depends on rotations about the 109.47° tetrahedral bonds of singly bonded carbon atoms.

When extruded into fibers through pores in an industry spinneret, the individual polymer chains tend to align because of viscous flow. If subjected to cold drawing afterwards, the fibers align further, increasing their crystallinity, and the material acquires additional tensile strength. In practice, nylon fibers are most often drawn using heated rolls at high speeds.

Block nylon tends to be less crystalline, except near the surfaces due to shearing stresses during formation. Nylon is clear and colorless, or milky, but is easily dyed. Multistranded nylon cord and rope is slippery and tends to unravel. The ends can be melted and fused with a heat source such as a flame or electrode to prevent this.

Nylons are hygroscopic and will absorb or desorb moisture as a function of the ambient humidity. Variations in moisture content have several effects on the polymer. Firstly, the dimensions will change, but more importantly moisture acts as a plasticizer, lowering the glass transition temperature (T_{g}), and consequently the elastic modulus at temperatures below the T_{g}

When dry, polyamide is a good electrical insulator. However, polyamide is hygroscopic. The absorption of water will change some of the material's properties such as its electrical resistance. Nylon is less absorbent than wool or cotton.

The characteristic features of nylon 66 include:

- Pleats and creases can be heat-set at higher temperatures
- More compact molecular structure
- Better weathering properties; better sunlight resistance
- Softer "Hand"
- High melting point (265 °C (509 °F))
- Superior colorfastness
- Excellent abrasion resistance

On the other hand, nylon 6 is easy to dye, more readily fades; it has a higher impact resistance, a more rapid moisture absorption, greater elasticity, and elastic recovery.

- Variation of luster: nylon has the ability to be very lustrous, semi-lustrous, or dull.
- Durability: its high tenacity fibers are used for seatbelts, tire cords, ballistic cloth, and other uses.
- High elongation
- Excellent abrasion resistance
- Highly resilient (nylon fabrics are heat-set)
- Paved the way for easy-care garments
- High resistance to insects, fungi, animals, as well as molds, mildew, rot, and many chemicals
- Used in carpets and nylon stockings
- Melts instead of burning
- Used in many military applications
- Good specific strength
- Transparent to infrared light (−12 dB)

Nylon clothing tends to be less flammable than cotton and rayon, but nylon fibers may melt and stick to skin.

== Uses ==
Nylon was first used commercially in a nylon-bristled toothbrush in 1938, followed more famously in women's stockings or "nylons" which were shown at the 1939 New York World's Fair and first sold commercially in 1940. Its use increased dramatically during World War II, when the need for fabrics increased dramatically.

=== Fibers ===
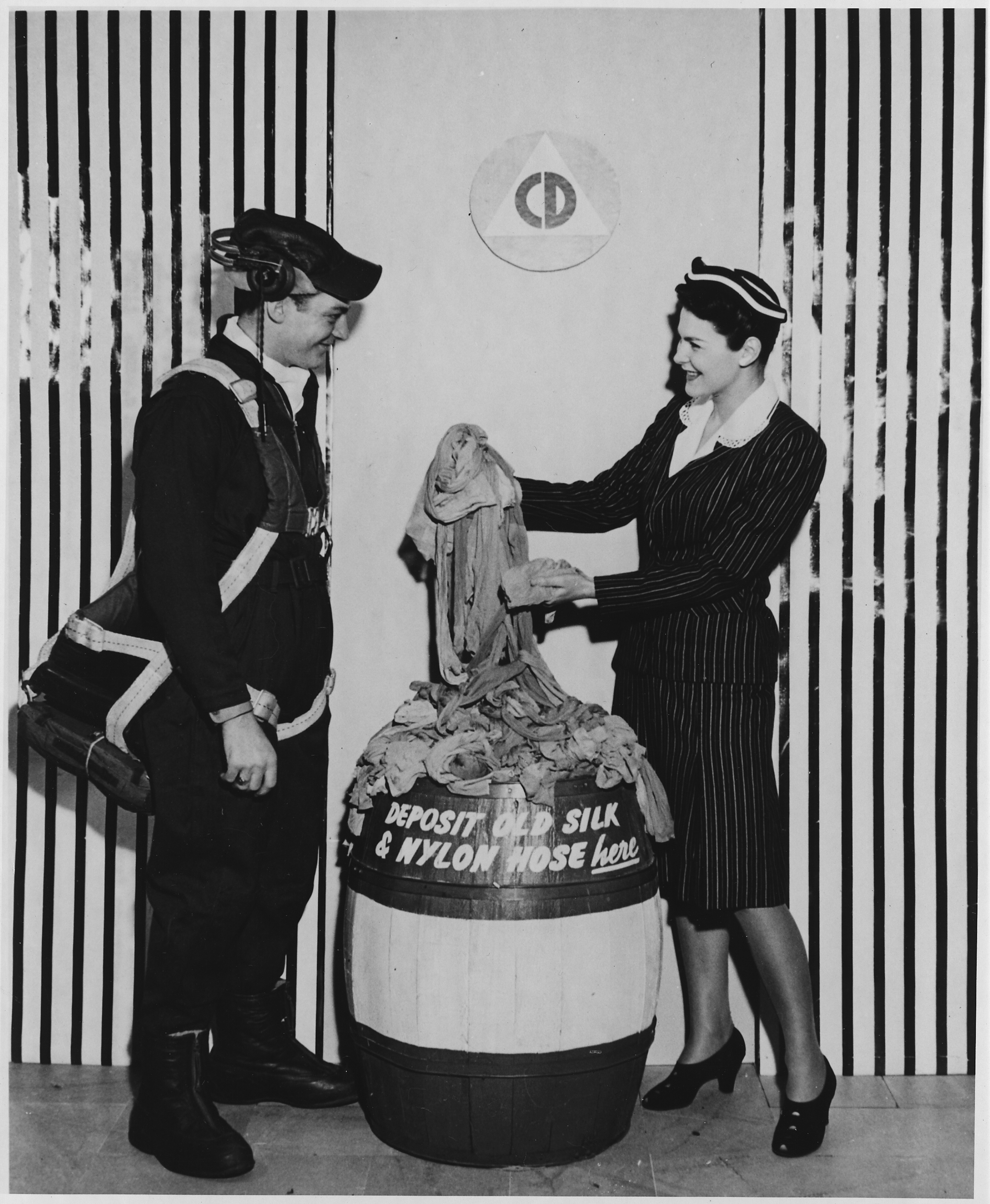
These worn out nylon stockings will be reprocessed and made into parachutes for army fliers c. 1942

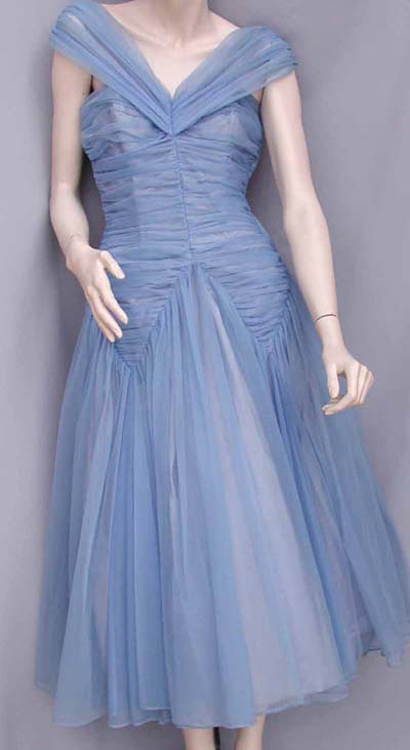
Blue nylon fabric ball gown by Emma Domb, Science History Institute

Bill Pittendreigh, DuPont, and other individuals and corporations worked diligently during the first few months of World War II to find a way to replace Asian silk and hemp with nylon in parachutes. It was also used to make tires, tents, ropes, ponchos, and other military supplies. It was even used in the production of a high-grade paper for U.S. currency. At the outset of the war, cotton accounted for more than 80% of all fibers used and manufactured, and wool fibers accounted for nearly all of the rest. By August 1945, manufactured fibers had taken a market share of 25%, at the expense of cotton. After the war, because of shortages of both silk and nylon, nylon parachute material was sometimes repurposed to make dresses.

Nylon 6 and 66 fibers are used in carpet manufacture.

Nylon is one kind of fiber used in tire cord. Herman E. Schroeder pioneered application of nylon in tires.

=== Molds and resins ===
Nylon resins are widely used in the automobile industry especially in the engine compartment.

Molded nylon is used in hair combs and mechanical parts such as machine screws, gears, gaskets, and other low- to medium-stress components previously cast in metal. Engineering-grade nylon is processed by extrusion, casting, and injection molding. Type 6,6 Nylon 101 is the most common commercial grade of nylon, and Nylon 6 is the most common commercial grade of molded nylon. For use in tools such as spudgers, nylon is available in glass-filled variants which increase structural and impact strength and rigidity, and molybdenum disulfide-filled variants which increase lubricity. Nylon can be used as the matrix material in composite materials, with reinforcing fibers like glass or carbon fiber; such a composite has a higher density than pure nylon. Such thermoplastic composites (25% to 30% glass fiber) are frequently used in car components next to the engine, such as intake manifolds, where the good heat resistance of such materials makes them feasible competitors to metals.

Nylon was used to make the stock of the Remington Nylon 66 rifle. The frame of the modern Glock pistol is made of a nylon composite.

=== Food packaging ===
Nylon resins are used as a component of food packaging films where an oxygen barrier is needed. Some of the terpolymers based upon nylon are used every day in packaging. Nylon has been used for meat wrappings and sausage sheaths. The high temperature resistance of nylon makes it useful for oven bags.

=== Filaments ===
Nylon filaments are primarily used in brushes especially toothbrushes and string trimmers. They are also used as monofilaments in fishing line. Nylon 610 and 612 are the most used polymers for filaments.

Its various properties also make it very useful as a material in additive manufacturing; specifically, as a filament in consumer and professional grade fused deposition modeling 3D printers.

=== Other forms ===
Nylon resins can be extruded into rods, tubes, and sheets.

Nylon powders are used to powder coat metals. Nylon 11 and Nylon 12 are the most widely used.

In the mid-1940s, classical guitarist Andrés Segovia mentioned the shortage of good guitar strings in the United States, particularly his favorite Pirastro catgut strings, to a number of foreign diplomats at a party, including General Lindeman of the British Embassy. A month later, the General presented Segovia with some nylon strings which he had obtained via some members of the DuPont family. Segovia found that although the strings produced a clear sound, they had a faint metallic timbre which he hoped could be eliminated. Nylon strings were first tried on stage by Olga Coelho in New York in January 1944. In 1946, Segovia and string maker Albert Augustine were introduced by their mutual friend Vladimir Bobri, editor of Guitar Review. On the basis of Segovia's interest and Augustine's past experiments, they decided to pursue the development of nylon strings. DuPont, skeptical of the idea, agreed to supply the nylon if Augustine would endeavor to develop and produce the actual strings. After three years of development, Augustine demonstrated a nylon first string whose quality impressed guitarists, including Segovia, in addition to DuPont. Wound strings, however, were more problematic. Eventually, however, after experimenting with various types of metal and smoothing and polishing techniques, Augustine was also able to produce high quality nylon wound strings.

== See also ==
- Ballistic nylon – Thick, tough, nylon fabric
- Cordura – Brand of high-performance fabrics developed by DuPont and now owned by Invista
- Forensic engineering – Investigation of failures associated with legal intervention
- Nylon-eating bacteria – Species of bacteria
- Polyamide – Macromolecule with repeating units linked by amide bonds
- Ripstop nylon – Reinforced woven fabric
- Step-growth polymerization – Type of polymerization reaction mechanism
