= 11-Aminoundecanoic acid =

Names
- Preferred IUPAC name 11-Aminoundecanoic acid

Identifiers
| CAS Number | 2432-99-7 |
| 3D model (JSmol) | Interactive image |
| ChemSpider | 16168 |
| ECHA InfoCard | 100.017.652 |
| PubChem CID | 17083 |
| UNII | SFU34976HB |
| CompTox Dashboard (EPA) | DTXSID5020077 |
- InChI: InChI=1S/C11H23NO2/c12-10-8-6-4-2-1-3-5-7-9-11(13)14/h1-10,12H2,(H,13,14) Key: GUOSQNAUYHMCRU-UHFFFAOYSA-N; InChI=1/C11H23NO2/c12-10-8-6-4-2-1-3-5-7-9-11(13)14/h1-10,12H2,(H,13,14) Key: GUOSQNAUYHMCRU-UHFFFAOYAM
- SMILES: C(CCCCCN)CCCCC(=O)O

Properties
| Chemical formula | C_{11}H_{23}NO_{2} |
| Molar mass | 201.310 g·mol^{−1} |
| Appearance | White solid |
| Density | 1,1720 g·cm−3 |
| Melting point | 188–191 °C (370–376 °F; 461–464 K) |
- Except where otherwise noted, data are given for materials in their standard state (at 25 °C [77 °F], 100 kPa). Infobox references

11-Aminoundecanoic acid is an organic compound with the formula H_{2}N(CH_{2})_{10}CO_{2}H. This compound is classified as an amine and a fatty acid. 11-Aminoundecanoic acid is a precursor to Nylon-11. 11-Aminoundecanoic acid is a white crystalline and odorless solid with low solubility in water.

== Production ==
As practiced by Arkema, 11-aminoundecanoic acid is prepared industrially from undecylenic acid, which is derived from castor oil. The synthesis proceeds in four separate reactions:

Crude castor oil consists of about 80% triglycerides, from the ricinoleic acid, itself representing about 90% of the oil. It is quantitatively transesterified with methanol to methyl ricinoleate (the methyl ester of ricinoleic acid) in the presence of the basic sodium methoxide at 80 °C within 1 h reaction time in a stirred reactor.

Rizinusöl-Umesterung

The methyl ricinoleate is converted to heptanal and methyl undecenoate by combining with steam in a cracking furnace at 400 - 575 °C. The cleavage of the aliphatic chain occurs selectively between the hydroxymethylene and the allyl-methylene group. Besides heptanal and methyl undecenoate, a mixture of methyl esters of saturated and unsaturated C18-carboxylic acids is obtained. This mixture is known under the trade name Esterol and is used as a lubricant additive.

Pyrolyse von Ricinolsäuremethylester

The methyl ester is next hydrolyzed to give 10-undecenoic acid (undecylenic acid).

The undecenoic acid is dissolved in toluene and, in the presence of the radical initiator benzoyl peroxide (BPO), gaseous hydrogen bromide is added, in contrary to the Markovnikov rule ("anti-Markovnikov"). When cooled to 0 °C, the fast and highly exothermic reaction produces 11-bromoundecanoic acid in 95% yield - the Markovnikov product 10-bromoundecanoic acid is produced in small quantities as a by-product. Toluene and unreacted hydrogen bromide are extracted under reduced pressure and reused.

11-Bromodecanoic acid is mixed at 30 °C with a large excess of 40% aqueous ammonia solution. When the reaction is complete, water is added and the mixture is heated to 100 °C to remove the excess ammonia.

The acid can be recrystallized from water. For further purification, the hydrochloride of 11-aminoundecanoic acid, which is available by acidification with hydrochloric acid, can be recrystallized from a methanol/ethyl acetate mixture.

== Use ==
By acylation of 11-aminoundecanoic acid with chloroacetyl chloride, chloroacetylamino-11-undecanoic acid can be produced, which acts as a fungicide and insecticide.

N-acyl derivatives of 11-aminoundecanoic acid in the form of oligomeric amides have remarkable properties as gelling agents for water and organic solvents.

=== Monomer for polyamide 11 ===
By far the most important application of 11-aminoundecanoic acid is its use as a monomer for polyamide 11 (also: nylon-11). Wallace Carothers, the inventor of polyamide (nylon 66), is said to have polymerized 11-aminoundecanoic acid as early as 1931.

Although polyamide 11 is derived from a renewable raw material (i.e. biobased), it is not biodegradable. Nevertheless, it has the most advantageous ecological profile of comparable thermoplastics. Due to its excellent toughness at low temperatures, polyamide 11 can be used at temperatures as low as −70 °C. Its relatively non-polar molecular structure due to the low frequency of amide bonds in the molecule results in low moisture absorption compared to polyamide 6 or polyamide 66. In addition, polyamide 11 has very good chemical stability, e.g. against hydrocarbons, low density, good thermal stability, weather resistance and is easy to process.
