= PA11 =

PA11 may refer to:

- Pennsylvania Route 11
- Pennsylvania Route 11 (1920s)
- Pennsylvania's 11th congressional district
- Piper PA-11, a light aircraft
- Polyamide 11, or Nylon 11
