= Denis Simpson =

Canadian actor and singer (1950–2010)

- Born: Dennis Anthony Leopold Simpson; 4 November 1950; St. Ann's Bay, Jamaica
- Died: 22 October 2010 (aged 59); Toronto, Ontario, Canada
- Other name: Dennis Simpson
- Occupation: Actor
- Years active: 1971–2010

Dennis Anthony Leopold Simpson (4 November 1950 – 22 October 2010) was a Canadian actor and singer best known as a host of the TV series Polka Dot Door. He was also an original member of the singing group The Nylons.

== Early life and family ==
Born in St. Ann's Bay, Jamaica, Simpson arrived in Canada at the age of eight and moved with his family to the Toronto suburb of Scarborough at age 10. He attended Guildwood Public School and was remembered as an exceptional student and a friendly and gentle young man. His half-sister, born 1964 in Toronto, is actress Gloria Reuben. At York University, where he studied for one year, Simpson focused on music, theatre, and dance.

== Career ==
The original bass vocalist for The Nylons in 1978–79, he left the band to appear in the Broadway musical Indigo before they became commercially successful.

Simpson was also a longtime host of the children's television series Polka Dot Door from 1978 until the mid-1980s. He appeared in such television series as Seeing Things, Mr. Dressup, Sharon, Lois & Bram's Elephant Show, Night Visions, These Arms of Mine, Robson Arms, and MacGyver and on the Canadian game shows Acting Crazy and Talk About. He also hosted a cooking show on Channel M called Café m and was the "Live Eye Guy" for Citytv Vancouver's Breakfast Television.

He was nominated for several Jessie Awards for his theatre work, winning one for his one-man show Denis Anyone? He was also involved in charitable work with AIDS organizations and hosting local events.

He died on 22 October 2010 of a sudden brain hemorrhage at age 59.

== Filmography ==
- Polka Dot Door (1978–mid-80s) TV series as the Host
- Utilities (1981) as Twinkle Toes
- Spasms (1983) as Abo Shaman
- Sharon, Lois & Bram's Elephant Show as Denis Simpson (2 episodes, 1984–1986)
  - – Amusement Park (1984) TV episode as Denis Simpson
  - – Marathon (1986) TV episode as Denis Simpson
- Comedy Factory as Angelo (2 episodes, 1985)
  - – Honey, It's the Mayor (1985) TV episode
  - – The Columnist (1985) TV episode as Angelo
- Flying (1986) as Fred Stoner
- Seeing Things as Eric (1 episode, 1986)
  - – I'm Dancing with Stars in My Eyes (1986) TV episode as Eric
- The Vindicator (1986) as Joe Simpson
- The Park Is Mine (1986) (TV) as Richie
- MacGyver as Ginko (1 episode, 1990)
  - – The Lost Amadeus (1990) TV episode as Ginko
- And the Sea Will Tell (1991) (TV) as Findlay
- Born Too Soon (1993) (TV) as Jeff
- These Arms of Mine (1999) TV series as Denis Simpson (unknown episodes)
- Get Your Stuff (2000) as Neal
- Soul Food as the Priest (1 episode, 2002)
  - – Let's Do It Again (2002) TV episode as the Priest
- Night Visions as Bokor (1 episode, 2001)
  - – The Bokor (2001) TV episode as Bokor
- Final Days of Planet Earth (2006) (TV) as the Chief Administrator
- Flash Gordon (1 episode, 2007)
  - – Infestation (2007) TV episode
- Robson Arms as the Minister (1 episode, 2008)
  - – My Brother's Keeper (2008) TV episode as the Minister
- The True Heroines (2011) as Earl the Milkman
- Cold Side of the Pillow (2017) as Father David

== Theatre (selected) ==
- The Full Monty, Horse (Patrick Street Productions)
- "Nggrfg, director (Edmonton Fringe Festival)
- Buddy, M.C. (Adam Henderson/Persephone Theatre)
- Urinetown, Senator Fipp/Lead (Donna Spencer/Firehall Theatre)
- Angels in America, Belize/Lead (Michael Fera/Hoars)
- Driving Miss Daisy, Hoke Coleburn/Lead (Lawrie Selligman/MTC)
- Ruthless, Sylvia St. Croix/Lead (David C. Jones/Ophidian Theatre Prod.)
- From Berlin To Broadway, Lead (Johnna Wright/Waterfront Theatre)
- I love you, You're Perfect, Now Change, Lead (Robert Metcalf/PPE)
- Wang Dang Doodle, Lead (Rick Kish/The Grand Theatre, London, Ont.)
- Daughter of the Regiment, Horentius (Michael Callaghan/Van. Opera Co.)
- Dames at Sea, Lucky/Lead (Bill Millerd/Arts Club Theatre)
- A Funny Thing Happened on the Way to the Forum, Pseudolus (Bob Ainsley/Theatre London/Grand Theatre)
- To Kill a Mockingbird, Reverend Sykes (Bob Baker/Citadel Theatre)
- Master Harold & The Boys, Willie (Pacific Theatre)
- Godspell, Jesus (Allen MacInnis/PTE)
- Blowin' Growin'...Bowen, As Cast (Roy Surette/Arts Club Theatre)
- Five Guys Named Moe, 4 Eyed Moe (Bill Millerd/Arts Club Theatre)
- Angels in America, Belize (Gordon McCaul/Centaur Theatre)
- The Relapse, Worthy (Susan Cox/Vancouver Playhouse)
- Denis, Anyone?, One Man Show (Arts Club Theatre/Fringe Festival)
- When The Rains Come, Chorus (Bill Millerd/Arts Club Theatre)
- Blowin' on Bowen, Johnny Angel (Kim Selody/Arts Club Theatre)
- Star Trick – The Musical, Spork (Vancouver Theatresports League)
- Prelude To a Kiss, Taylor (Sherie Bie/Arts Club Theatre)
- Lend Me a Tenor, Bellhop (Tom Kerr/Arts Club Theatre)
- Robin Hood, Denis/Morris (David Tagouri/Citadel Theatre)
- Head A Tete, Clown with Doll (Stephen Heatley/Citadel Theatre)
- The Coloured Museum, Lead/Director (Donna Spencer/Firehall Theatre)
- Ain't Misbehavin', Andre (Marlene Smith/Toronto Musical Production)
- Jesus Christ Superstar, Simon (Broadway)
- The Last Days of Judas Iscariot, Pontius Pilate (Pacific Theatre)
- Thoroughly Modern Millie (Gateway Theatre)
