= Pyrrole–imidazole polyamides =

Chemical compound

Pyrrole–imidazole polyamides (PIPs) are a class of polyamides have the ability to bind to minor grooves found in the DNA helix. Scientists are experimenting with it as a drug-delivery mode that can switch genes on and off, as well as epigenetic modification in gene therapy.
