= Nylon 11 =

Polymer

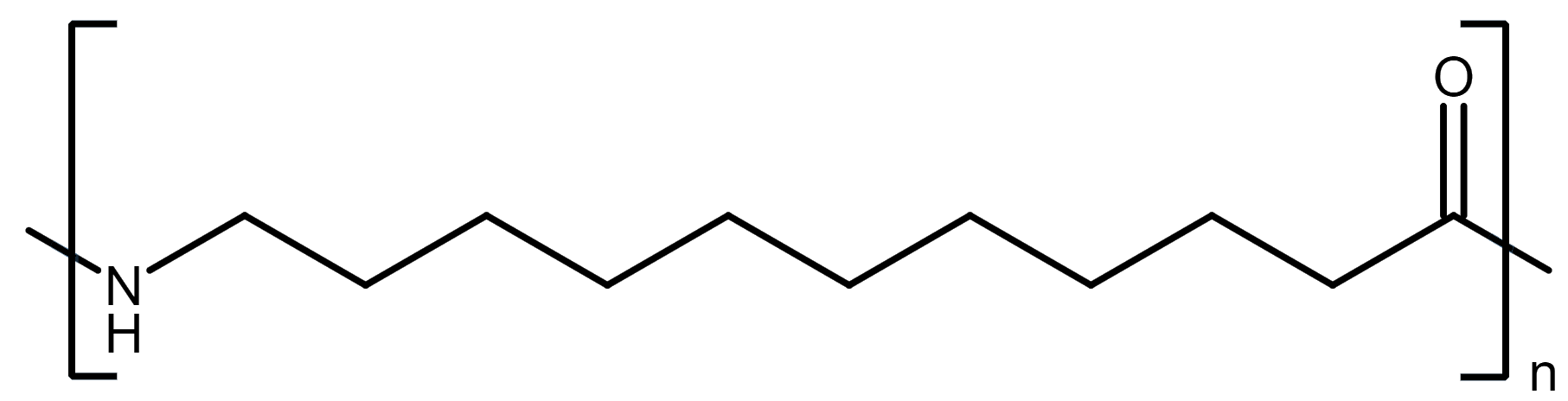
Skeletal formula of a polyamide 11 repeating unit

Nylon 11 or Polyamide 11 (PA 11) is a polyamide, bioplastic and a member of the nylon family of polymers produced by the polymerization of 11-aminoundecanoic acid. It is produced from castor beans by Arkema under the trade name Rilsan.

Nylon 11 is applied in the fields of oil and gas, aerospace, automotive, textiles, electronics and sports equipment, frequently in tubing, wire sheathing, and metal coatings.

== History ==
In 1938, a research director for Thann & Mulhouse, Joseph Zeltner, first conceived the idea of Nylon 11, which was suggested in the works of Wallace Carothers. Thann & Mulhouse had already been involved in processing castor oil for 10-undecenoic-acid, which would eventually be converted into the first amount of 11-aminoundecanoic acid in 1940 with the help of coworkers Michel Genas and Marcel Kastner. In 1944, Kastner sufficiently improved the monomer process and the first patents for Nylon 11 were filed in 1947. The first nylon 11 thread was created in 1950 and full industrial production began with the opening of the Marseilles production facility in 1955, which remains the sole producer of 11-aminoudecanoic acid today.

Currently Arkema polymerizes Nylon 11 in Birdsboro, PA, Changshu, and Serquigny.

== Chemistry ==
The chemical process of creating Nylon 11 begins with ricinoleic acid which makes up 85-90% of castor oil. Ricinoleic acid is first transesterified with methanol creating methyl ricinoleate, which is then cracked to create heptaldehyde and methyl undecylenate. These undergo hydrolysis to create methanol, which is re-used in the initial transesterification of ricinoleic acid, and undecylenic acid that is added on to hydrogen bromide. After hydrolysis, hydrogen bromide then undergoes nucleophilic substitution with ammonia to form 11-aminoundecanoic acid, which is polymerized into nylon 11.

== Properties ==
As seen in the table below, Nylon 11 has lower values of density, flexural and Young's modulus, water absorption, as well as melting and glass transition temperatures. Nylon 11 is seen to have increased dimensional stability in the presence of moisture due to its low concentration of amides. Nylon 11 experiences 0.2-0.5% length variation and 1.9% weight variation after 25 weeks of submersion in water in comparison to 2.2-2.7% elongation variation and 9.5% weight variation for Nylon 6.

When specially orientated into the δ' phase, Nylon 11 11 can exhibit piezoelectric properties.

General properties of Nylon 11, Nylon 6
	Density	Young's modulus	Flexural modulus	Elongation at break	Water absorption at 0.32 cm thick and 24 h	Melting point	Glass transition temperature
Nylon 11	1.03-1.05 g/cm^{3}	335 MPa	1200 MPa	300-400%	0.4%	180-190 °C	42 °C
Nylon 6	1.13 - 1.16 g/cm^{3}	725 - 863 MPa	2400 Mpa	300%	1.3-1.9%	210 - 220 °C	48-60 °C

== Applications ==
=== Tubing ===
Due to its low water absorption, increased dimensional stability when exposed to moisture, heat and chemical resistance, flexibility, and burst strength, nylon 11 is used in various applications for tubing. In the fields of automotive, aerospace, pneumatics, medical, and oil and gas, nylon 11 is used in fuel lines, hydraulic hoses, air lines, umbilical hoses, catheters, and beverage tubing.

=== Electrical ===
Nylon 11 is used in cable and wire sheathing as well as electrical housings, connectors and clips.

=== Coatings ===
Nylon 11 is used in metal coatings for noise reduction and protection against UV exposure as well as resistance to chemicals, abrasion, and corrosion.

=== Textiles ===
Nylon 11 is used in textiles through brush bristles, lingerie, filters, as well as woven and technical fabrics.

=== Sports Equipment ===
Nylon 11 is used in the soles and other mechanical parts of footwear. It is also seen in racket sports for racket strings, eyelets, and badminton shuttlecocks. Nylon 11 is used for the top layering of skis.
