= The Nylons =

Canadian vocal group

- Origin: Toronto, Ontario, Canada
- Genres: A cappella
- Years active: 1978–2017
- Labels: Attic; Shoreline; Scotti Bros.
- Past members: Marc Connors (tenor; 1978–1991); Paul Cooper (baritone; 1978–1990); Denis Simpson (bass; 1978–1979); Ralph Cole (bass; 1979–1981); Arnold Robinson (bass; 1981–2006); Micah Barnes (baritone; 1990–1994); Billy Newton-Davis (tenor; 1991–1994); Mark Cassius (baritone; 1997–2005); Claude Morrison (tenor; 1978–2017); Garth Mosbaugh (tenor, baritone; –2017); Gavin Hope (baritone, tenor, bass; –2017); Tyrone Gabriel (bass, baritone; –2017)

The Nylons were an a cappella group founded in 1978 in Toronto, Ontario, Canada, best known for their covers of pop songs such as The Turtles' "Happy Together", Steam's "Na Na Hey Hey Kiss Him Goodbye", and The Tokens' "The Lion Sleeps Tonight".

The band's final lineup included Claude Morrison (tenor), Garth Mosbaugh (tenor/baritone), Gavin Hope (baritone/tenor/bass), and Tyrone Gabriel (bass/baritone). Morrison was the only original member in the final lineup. The band has reissued all their albums on CD through Unidisc Music.

The band announced their retirement in 2016, and their final tour ended in 2017.

== Career ==
The Nylons' original lineup consisted of Claude Morrison (tenor), Paul Cooper (baritone; born James Paul Cooper in Pikeville, Tennessee, February 20, 1950 – December 29, 2013), Marc Connors (tenor), and Denis Simpson (bass). In April 1979, Simpson left the group to perform in a musical and was replaced by Ralph Cole (bass). All of the original members were gay men, although later lineups included both gay and non-gay singers. Cole left the band in late 1981 and was replaced by Arnold Robinson (bass).

In 1986, the group appeared on the critically acclaimed children's television show Sharon, Lois & Bram's Elephant Show, featuring children's entertainers Sharon, Lois & Bram. The Nylons appeared in Season 3 of the show on the "Treasure Island" episode, singing "The Lion Sleeps Tonight". These songs appeared on the band's albums Seamless (1984) and Rockapella (1989). During this era, the band also gained exposure from the mid-1980s syndicated sitcom Throb by singing (with the show's lead actress Diana Canova) the theme to the show.

The Nylons also appeared on the very popular new Super Dave Osborne Show in Season 1, Episode 8 in 1987, singing "Kiss Him Goodbye".

In October 24, 1992, The Nylons sang "O Canada" at Atlanta-Fulton County Stadium in Atlanta, Georgia, preceding Game 6 of the 1992 World Series, in which their hometown team, the Toronto Blue Jays, won their first championship.

Cooper retired from the band in 1990 and was replaced by Micah Barnes (baritone). Connors died in 1991 as a result of AIDS-related complications, and was replaced by Billy Newton-Davis (tenor). In 1994, both Newton-Davis and Barnes left the group to pursue their solo careers, and were replaced by Garth Mosbaugh (tenor) and Gavin Hope (baritone), respectively. In 1997, Hope left the group to pursue a solo career and was replaced by Mark Cassius (baritone). In 2005, Cassius left the group; Tyrone Gabriel replaced him. After Robinson's retirement in early 2006, Gavin Hope returned as baritone; Tyrone Gabriel moved to the bass position to replace Robinson.

Paul Cooper died in 2013 of cardiac arrest, at the age of 63.

On May 30, 2014, the Nylons performed a show in Toronto which included the participation of every living past or present member of the band.

In the fall and winter of 2016, The Nylons toured and performed their farewell show throughout Canada, before disbanding in 2017.

== Members ==
- Marc Connors (tenor 1978–1991) (died March 1991)*
- Paul Cooper (baritone 1978–1990) (died December 29, 2013)*
- Claude Morrison (tenor 1978–2017) (died April 22, 2025)*
- Denis Simpson (bass 1978–1979) (died October 22, 2010)*
- Ralph Cole (bass 1979–1981) (deceased, buried in Manitoba, Canada)
- Arnold Robinson (bass 1981–2006) (died March 16, 2013)
- Micah Barnes (baritone 1990–1994)
- Billy Newton-Davis (tenor 1991–1994)
- Garth Mosbaugh (tenor 1994–2017)
- Gavin Hope (baritone 1994–1997, 2006–2017)
- Mark Cassius (baritone 1997–2005)
- Tyrone Gabriel (baritone 2005, bass 2006–2017) (died January 11, 2022)

* Denotes the four founding members.

== Discography ==
Albums from 1982–1989 were released on Attic Records in Canada and Windham Hill in the United States, albums from 1989–1996 were released on BMG's Scotti Brothers imprint, and albums after 1997 were released on Shoreline Records.

- Some People (1980, EP)
- The Nylons (1982) #8 Canada
- One Size Fits All (1982) - #59 AUS / #25 Canada
- Seamless (1984) - #133 Billboard 200 / #40 Canada
- Happy Together (1987) - #43 Billboard 200 / #45 Canada
- Rockapella (1989) #60 Canada
- The Very Best of The Nylons (1989, compilation)
- 4 on the Floor (1991, live)
- Live to Love (1992)
- The Best of the Nylons (1993, compilation)
- Illustrious: A Collection of Classic Hits (1993, compilation)
- Because... (1994) (a.k.a. Another Fine Mesh)
- Harmony: The Christmas Songs (1994)
- Run for Cover (1996)
- Hits of the 60's: A Cappella Style (1997, compilation))
- Fabric of Life (1997)
- Perfect Fit (1997, compilation)
- A Wish for You (1999)
- Lost and Found (1999) (previously unreleased tracks and new arrangements)
- Fabric of Life: Vocal Percussion Remix (2000)
- Play On (2002)
- Sterling (2006) (compilation double album with new material)
- Skintight (2011)

=== Singles ===
Year	Song	Peak chart positions				
Year	Song	Can.Top Singles	AUS	US Hot 100	US Adult	Album
1982	"Up the Ladder to the Roof"	-	-	-	-	One Size Fits All
1986	"The Lion Sleeps Tonight"	91	-	-	-	The Nylons
1987	"Kiss Him Goodbye"	15	93	12	10	Happy Together
1987	"Happy Together"	-	-	75	16	Happy Together
1989	"Poison Ivy"	-	-	-	-	Rockapella
1989	"Wildfire"	53	-	-	-	Rockapella
1994/95	"Time Of The Season"	32	-	-	-	Because
1994/95	"Love T.K.O."	39	-	-	-	Because
1996	"God Only Knows"	83	-	-	-	Run For Cover
