= Polyamide =

Macromolecule with repeating units linked by amide bonds

A polyamide is a polymer with repeating units linked by amide bonds.

Polyamides occur both naturally and artificially. Examples of naturally occurring polyamides are proteins, such as wool and silk. Artificially made polyamides can be made through step-growth polymerization or solid-phase synthesis yielding materials such as nylons, aramids, and sodium polyaspartate. Synthetic polyamides are commonly used in textiles, automotive industry, carpets, kitchen utensils and sportswear due to their high durability and strength. The transportation manufacturing industry is the major consumer, accounting for 35% of polyamide (PA) consumption.

== Classification ==
Polymers of amino acids are known as polypeptides or proteins.

According to the composition of their main chain, synthetic polyamides are classified as follows:

Family	Main chain	Examples	Commercial products
Aliphatic polyamides	Aliphatic	Nylon PA 6 and PA 66	Zytel from DuPont, Technyl from Solvay, Rilsan and Rilsamid from Arkema, Radipol from Radici Group
Polyphthalamides	Semi-aromatic	PA 6T = hexamethylenediamine + terephthalic acid	Trogamid T from Evonik Industries, Amodel from Solvay
Aromatic polyamides, or aramids	Aromatic	Paraphenylenediamine + terephthalic acid	Kevlar and Nomex from DuPont, Teijinconex, Twaron and Technora from Teijin Aramid, Kermel from Kermel.

All polyamides are made by the formation of an amide function to link two molecules of monomer together. The monomers can be amides themselves (usually in the form of a cyclic lactam such as caprolactam), α,ω-amino acids or a stoichiometric mixture of a diamine and a diacid. Both these kinds of precursors give a homopolymer. Polyamides are easily copolymerized, and thus many mixtures of monomers are possible which can in turn lead to many copolymers. Additionally many nylon polymers are miscible with one another allowing the creation of blends.

== Polymerization chemistry ==
Production of polyamides requires the repeated joining of two groups to form an amide linkage. In this case this specifically involves amide bonds, and the two groups involved are an amine group, and a terminal carbonyl component of a functional group. These react to produce a carbon-nitrogen bond, creating a singular amide linkage. This process involves the elimination of other atoms previously part of the functional groups. The carbonyl-component may be part of either a carboxylic acid group or the more reactive acyl halide derivative. The amine group and the carboxylic acid group can be on the same monomer, or the polymer can be constituted of two different bifunctional monomers, one with two amine groups, the other with two carboxylic acid or acid chloride groups.

The condensation reaction is used to synthetically produce nylon polymers in industry. Nylons must specifically include a straight chain (aliphatic) monomer. The amide link is produced from an amine group (alternatively known as an amino group), and a carboxylic acid group. The hydroxyl from the carboxylic acid combines with a hydrogen from the amine, and gives rise to water, the elimination byproduct that is the namesake of the reaction.

As an example of condensation reactions, consider that in living organisms, amino acids are condensed with one another by an enzyme to form amide linkages (known as peptides). The resulting polyamides are known as proteins or polypeptides. In the diagram below, consider the amino-acids as single aliphatic monomers reacting with identical molecules to form a polyamide, focusing on solely the amine and acid groups. Ignore the substituent R groups – under the assumption the difference between the R groups are negligible:

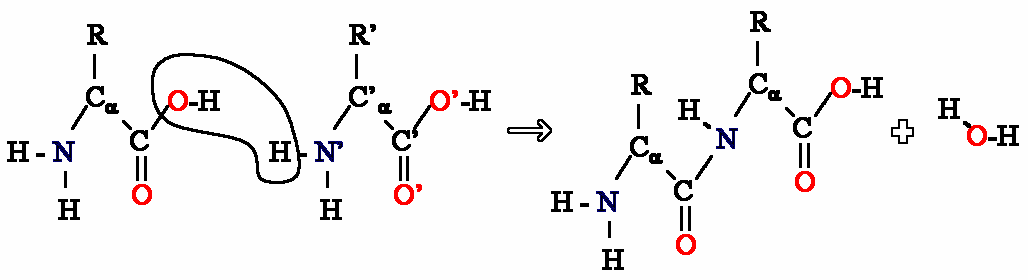
The reaction of two amino acids. Many of these reactions produce long chain proteins.

For fully aromatic polyamides or aramids e.g. Kevlar, the more reactive acyl chloride is used as a monomer. The polymerization reaction with the amine group eliminates hydrogen chloride. The acid chloride route can be used as a laboratory synthesis to avoid heating and obtain an almost instantaneous reaction. The aromatic moiety itself does not participate in elimination reaction, but it does increase the rigidity and strength of the resulting material which leads to Kevlar's renowned strength.

In the diagram below, an aramid is made from two different monomers which continuously alternate to form the polymer chain. Aramids are aromatic polyamides:

The reaction of 1,4-phenyl-diamine (para-phenylenediamine) and terephthaloyl chloride to produce an aramid

Polyamides can also be synthesized from dinitriles using acid catalysis via an application of the Ritter reaction. This method is applicable for preparation of nylon 1,6 from adiponitrile, formaldehyde and water. Additionally, polyamides can be synthesized from glycols and dinitriles using this method as well.

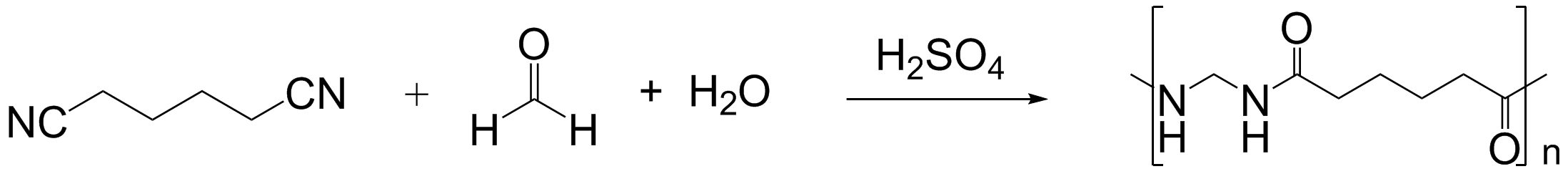
Synthesis of Nylon 1,6 from adiponitrile, formaldehyde, and water using sulfuric acid as a catalyst

== See also ==
- Polyamide-imide
- Pyrrole–imidazole polyamides
