= Nylon 1,6 =

Type of polyamide

Nylon 1,6 (a.k.a. polyamide 1,6) is a type of polyamide or nylon. Unlike most other nylons, nylon 1,6 is not a condensation polymer, but instead is formed by an acid-catalyzed synthesis from adiponitrile, formaldehyde, and water. The material was produced and studied by researchers at DuPont in the 1950s. Synthesis can be performed at room temperature in open beakers.

== Synthesis of nylon 1,6 ==
Nylon 1,6 is synthesized from adiponitrile, formaldehyde, and water by acid catalysis. Adiponitrile and formaldehyde (aqueous, paraformaldehyde, or trioxane) are combined with an acid (typically sulfuric acid) in a reactor. The reaction can be performed at room temperature. However, the reaction is exothermic, and especially at high ratios of formaldehyde to adiponitrile, cooling may be required.

CH_{2}O + NC-(CH_{2})_{4}-CN + H_{2}O → [-NH-CH_{2}-NH-OC-(CH_{2})_{4}-CO-]_{n}

Addition of water to the reaction mixture readily precipitates the nylon 1,6 product, which can then be isolated and washed with water to afford high purity polymer.

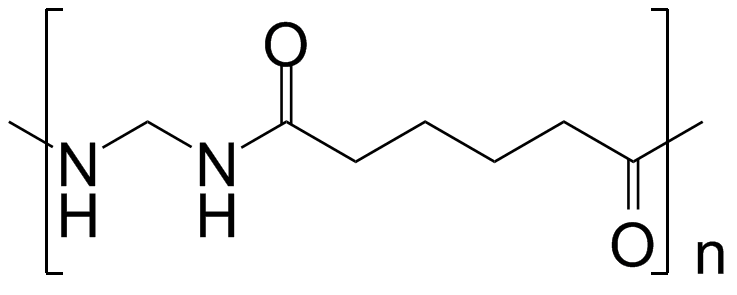
Nylon 1,6

== Properties and applications ==
The DuPont evaluations of the 1950s era indicated that polyamide-1,6 was less acid stable than nylon 66, and melts over 300–325 °C, with some decomposition. However, films were reported to have been successfully pressed at 275–290 °C. Molecular weight determined to be ~22,000–34,000 via an osmotic pressure method. The polymer was believed to be significantly branched and cross-linked owing to side reactions occurring during the acid catalyzed polymerization, but this was not conclusively established.

Similar to other formaldehyde-based thermoset resins, thermal behavior of the polymer is a function of the CH_{2}O/ADN ratio employed in the synthesis.

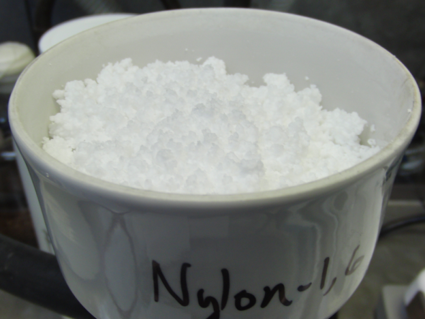
Sample of nylon 1,6

Melting point was found to increase with increasing synthesis CH_{2}O/ADN ratio, along with apparent increase in cross-linking, and reduction in crystallinity. Additionally, spectral features of ^{1}H-NMR of nylon 1,6 samples were found to trend with CH_{2}O/ADN synthesis ratio as well. Collectively, these properties parallel those of other formaldehyde-based thermoset resins, and it is interesting that nylon 1,6 is a rare example of a polyamide thermoset resin rather than a thermoplastic material.

Nylon 1,6 has been reported to exhibit a high moisture absorbance owing to the significant density of amide residues in the polymer, >130% of its weight (compare to ~2–2.5% for nylon 66 and nylon 6).
