= Nylon TMDT =

Type of transparent nylon

Nylon TMDT (also known as Nylon 6-3-T) is a type of transparent nylon, useful where transparency and chemical resistance are required in the same application. This polymer was launched by Dynamit Nobel in 1968 under the name Trogamid T. In 1988, the business was acquired by Hüls which later became Evonik.

TMD is derived from isophorone, a trimer of acetone. The polymerization is unusual for a nylon polymer. In the first step TMD is reacted with dimethyl terephthalate and methanol is removed to form an amide. In a second step polycondensation is done to make nylon TMDT.
