= The Nylons (album) =

Studio album by the Nylons
- Released: 1982
- Genre: Pop, adult contemporary, a cappella, soft rock
- Length: 34:51
- Label: Attic
- Producer: Sean Delaney, Bob Gallo, the Nylons

The Nylons chronology
The Nylons (1982)	One Size Fits All (1982)

The Nylons is the debut album from the Canadian a cappella quartet the Nylons released on Attic Records. The platinum-selling album contains their cover version of "The Lion Sleeps Tonight", and other hit songs as well as the group members' own compositions. Group members were Marc Connors (tenor), Claude Morrison (tenor), Paul Cooper (baritone) and Arnold Robinson (bass). The album reached number 8 in Canada.

== Track listing ==
No.	Title	Writer(s)	Length
1.	"The Lion Sleeps Tonight"	George David Weiss, Hugo Peretti	4:48
2.	"Love Potion No. 9 (Spooky)"	Jerry Leiber, Mike Stoller	3:38
3.	"A Million Ways"	Marc Connors, Paul Cooper	2:51
4.	"Somethin' 'Bout Cha"	Paul Cooper	3:19
5.	"Duke of Earl"	Eugene Dixon, Earl Edwards, Bernice Williams	3:01
6.	"Rock and Roll Lullaby"	Barry Mann, Cynthia Weil	4:14
7.	"Find the One I Love"	Marc Connors	2:45
8.	"Some People"	Paul Cooper	1:58
9.	"Up on the Roof"	Gerry Goffin, Carole King	3:40
10.	"Me and the Boys"	Paul Cooper	4:09

== Personnel ==
The Nylons

- Marc Connors - tenor vocals
- Claude Morrison - tenor vocals
- Paul Cooper - baritone vocals
- Arnold Robinson - bass vocals

== Certifications ==
The album attained platinum sales status within two months of its release.
