= Trimethylhexamethylenediamine =

2,2,4-Trimethylhexamethylenediamine
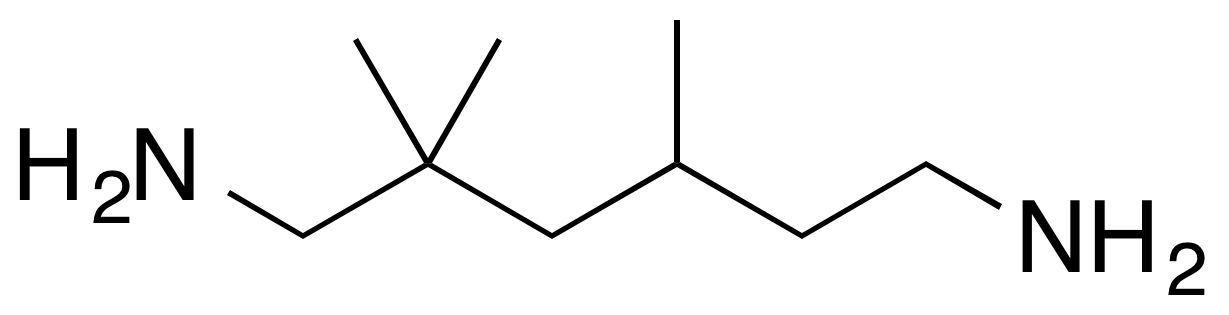

Names
- Preferred IUPAC name 2,2,4-Trimethylhexane-1,6-diamine

Identifiers
CAS Number	3236-54-2
3D model (JSmol)	Interactive image
ChEMBL	ChEMBL3182194
ChemSpider	69172
EC Number	221-793-1
PubChem CID	76714
UNII	595BQ3Q70K
CompTox Dashboard (EPA)	DTXSID30274136
- InChI: InChI=1S/C9H22N2/c1-8(4-5-10)6-9(2,3)7-11/h8H,4-7,10-11H2,1-3H3 Key: JCUZDQXWVYNXHD-UHFFFAOYSA-N
- SMILES: CC(CC(C)(C)CCN)CN

Properties
Chemical formula	C_{9}H_{22}N_{2}
Molar mass	158.289 g·mol^{−1}
- Except where otherwise noted, data are given for materials in their standard state (at 25 °C [77 °F], 100 kPa). Infobox references

2,4,4-Trimethylhexamethylenediamine
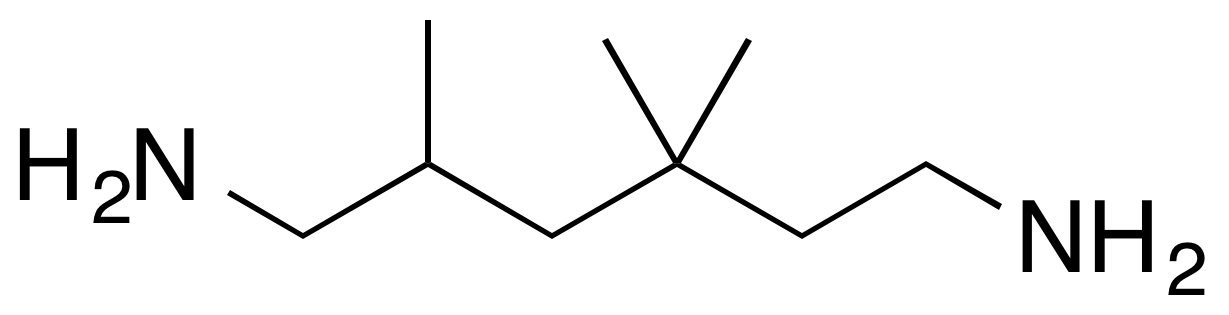

Names
- Preferred IUPAC name 2,4,4-Trimethylhexane-1,6-diamine

Identifiers
CAS Number	3236-53-1
3D model (JSmol)	Interactive image
ChemSpider	83906
EC Number	221-792-6
PubChem CID	92950
- InChI: InChI=1S/C9H22N2/c1-8(7-11)6-9(2,3)4-5-10/h8H,4-7,10-11H2,1-3H3 Key: DPQHRXRAZHNGRU-UHFFFAOYSA-N
- SMILES: CC(CCN)CC(C)(C)CN

Properties
Chemical formula	C_{9}H_{22}N_{2}
Molar mass	158.289 g·mol^{−1}

Hazards
- GHS labelling
Pictograms	(GHS05: Corrosive) (GHS07: Exclamation mark)
Signal word	Danger
Hazard statements	H302, H314, H317, H412
Precautionary statements	P260, P264, P270, P272, P273, P280, P301+P312, P301+P330+P331, P302+P352, P303+P361+P353, P304+P340, P305+P351+P338, P310, P321, P330, P333+P313, P363, P405, P501
- Except where otherwise noted, data are given for materials in their standard state (at 25 °C [77 °F], 100 kPa). Infobox references

Trimethylhexamethylenediamine is the name used to refer to a mixture of two isomers of trimethyl-1,6-hexanediamine. The mixture is used as a monomer in nylon TMDT. It is available commercially under the trade name Vestamin TMD from the company Evonik Industries.

Trimethylhexamethylenediamine is synthesized from isophorone. Isophorone is reduced by hydrogenation to the trimethylcyclohexanol, which is then oxidized with nitric acid (in the same fashion as adipic acid is synthesized from cyclohexane). The diacid, again a mixture of two "trimethyladipic acids", is converted to the diamine via the dinitrile.

== Uses ==
TMD is used as a component in certain curing agents for epoxy resins.
