= Hydroxycitronellal =

Names
- IUPAC name 7-Hydroxy-3,7-dimethyloctanal
- Other names 7-Hydroxycitronellal

Identifiers
CAS Number	107-75-5
3D model (JSmol)	Interactive image
ChEBI	CHEBI:53459
ChEMBL	ChEMBL3186027
ChemSpider	7600
DrugBank	DB14187
ECHA InfoCard	100.003.199
EC Number	203-518-7
PubChem CID	7888; 1266924 (R); 1715134 (S)
UNII	8SQ0VA4YUR
CompTox Dashboard (EPA)	DTXSID6042232
- InChI: InChI=1S/C10H20O2/c1-9(6-8-11)5-4-7-10(2,3)12/h8-9,12H,4-7H2,1-3H3 Key: WPFVBOQKRVRMJB-UHFFFAOYSA-N
- SMILES: CC(CCCC(C)(C)O)CC=O

Properties
Chemical formula	C_{10}H_{20}O_{2}
Molar mass	172.268 g·mol^{−1}
Density	0.922 g/cm^{3}
- Except where otherwise noted, data are given for materials in their standard state (at 25 °C [77 °F], 100 kPa). Infobox references

Hydroxycitronellal (7-hydroxy-3,7-dimethyloctanal) is an odorant used in perfumery. Its molecular formula is C_{10}H_{20}O_{2}.

It derives from a citronellal. 7-Hydroxy-3, 7-dimethyloctanal, also known as 3, 7-dimethyl-7-hydroxyoctan-1-al or 7-hydroxycitronellal, belongs to the class of organic compounds known as medium-chain aldehydes.

It has a sweet floral, lily, sweet, green, waxy, tropical, and slight melon and citrus undertones.

The hydroxycitronellal & indole condensation product is known as Indolene [68908-82-7]. (Has a floral animalic note).

The hydroxycitronellal & methyl anthranilate Schiff-base is known as Aurantiol (aka Auralva). It is extensively used in a large variety of floral notes such as orange-blossom, linden-blossom and tuberose.

== See also ==
- Citronellal
