= Methyl ricinoleate =

Names
- Preferred IUPAC name Methyl (9Z,12R)-12-Hydroxyoctadec-9-enoate
- Other names Methyl ricinoleate; Ricinoleic acid methyl ester; Methyl ricinolate

Identifiers
CAS Number	141-24-2
3D model (JSmol)	Interactive image
ChemSpider	4510369
ECHA InfoCard	100.004.976
EC Number	205-472-3
PubChem CID	5354133
UNII	90FDR3O96Y
CompTox Dashboard (EPA)	DTXSID2029169
- InChI: InChI=1S/C19H36O3/c1-3-4-5-12-15-18(20)16-13-10-8-6-7-9-11-14-17-19(21)22-2/h10,13,18,20H,3-9,11-12,14-17H2,1-2H3/b13-10-/t18-/m1/s1 Key: XKGDWZQXVZSXAO-ADYSOMBNSA-N
- SMILES: CCCCCCC(CC=CCCCCCCCC(=O)OC)O

Properties
Chemical formula	C_{19}H_{36}O_{3}
Molar mass	312.494 g·mol^{−1}
Density	0.9236 g/mL at 22 °C
Melting point	−4.5 °C (23.9 °F; 268.6 K)
Solubility in water	9.87×10^{−2} mg/L
- Except where otherwise noted, data are given for materials in their standard state (at 25 °C [77 °F], 100 kPa). Infobox references

Methyl ricinoleate is a clear, viscous fluid that is used as a surfactant, cutting fluid additive, lubricant, and plasticizer. It is a plasticizer for cellulosic resins, polyvinyl acetate, and polystyrene. It is a type of fatty acid methyl ester synthesized from castor oil and methyl alcohol.

Methyl rinioleate was early shown to be cleaved by ozone to give azelaic acid.
