= Nonanal =

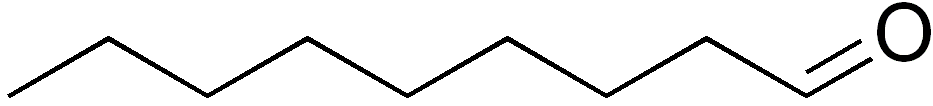

Names
- Preferred IUPAC name Nonanal
- Other names Nonanaldehyde; Nonaldehyde; Pelargonaldehyde; Aldehyde C-9

Identifiers
CAS Number	124-19-6
3D model (JSmol)	Interactive image
ChemSpider	29029
ECHA InfoCard	100.004.263
PubChem CID	31289
UNII	2L2WBY9K6T
CompTox Dashboard (EPA)	DTXSID9021639
- InChI: InChI=1S/C9H18O/c1-2-3-4-5-6-7-8-9-10/h9H,2-8H2,1H3 Key: GYHFUZHODSMOHU-UHFFFAOYSA-N; InChI=1/C9H18O/c1-2-3-4-5-6-7-8-9-10/h9H,2-8H2,1H3 Key: GYHFUZHODSMOHU-UHFFFAOYAJ
- SMILES: CCCCCCCCC=O

Properties
Chemical formula	C_{9}H_{18}O
Molar mass	142.242 g·mol^{−1}
Appearance	Colourless liquid
Density	0.827 g/cm^{3}
Melting point	−18 °C (0 °F; 255 K)
Boiling point	191 °C (376 °F; 464 K)
Solubility in water	Insoluble

Related compounds
Related aldehydes	Octanal Decanal
- Except where otherwise noted, data are given for materials in their standard state (at 25 °C [77 °F], 100 kPa). verify (what is ?) Infobox references

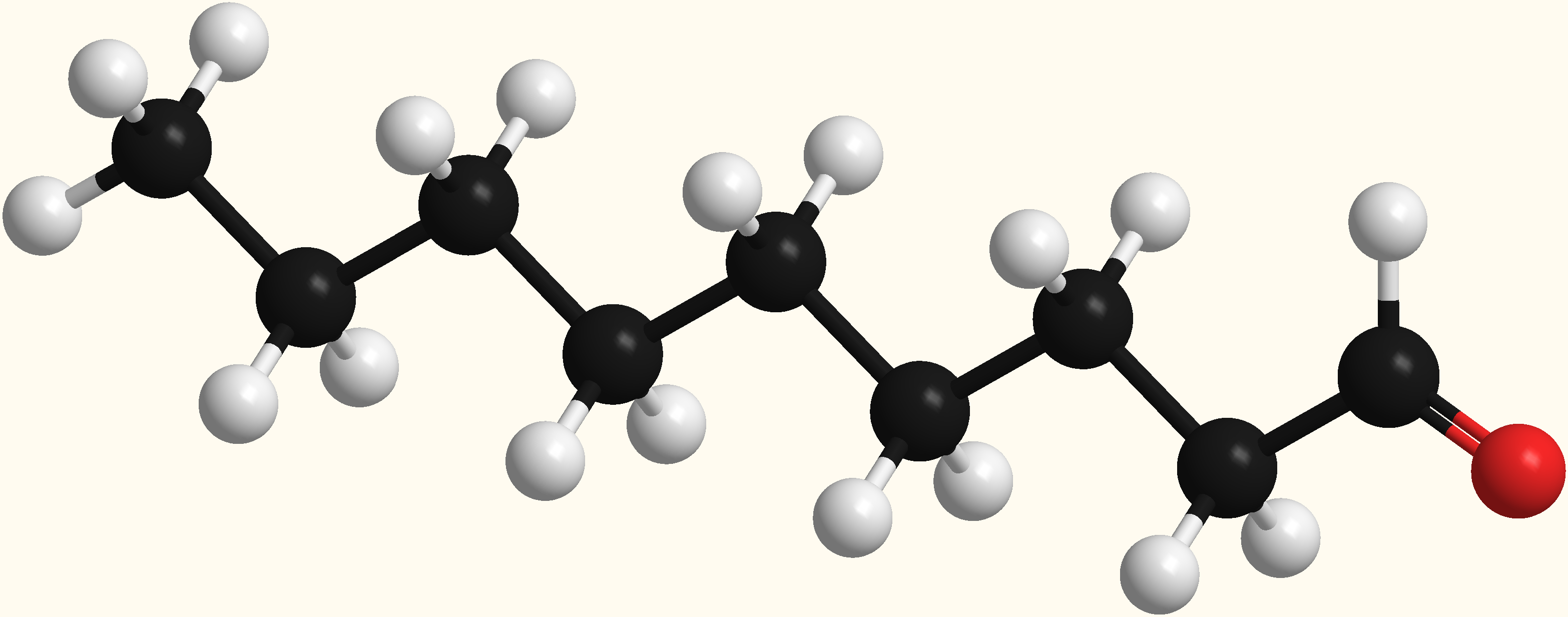
Chemical depiction of Nonanol

Nonanal is an organic compound with the chemical formula CH_{3}(CH_{2})_{7}CHO. It is one of several isomers, all are colorless oil. The nonanals are classified as aldehydes. The linear nonanal is produced commercially by the hydroformylation of 1-octene. It is used as a fragrance.

== Mosquitoes ==
Nonanal has been identified as a compound that attracts Culex mosquitoes. Nonanal acts synergistically with carbon dioxide in that regard.
