= Octanal =

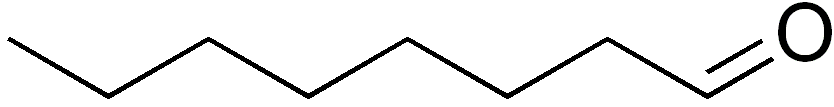

Names
- Preferred IUPAC name Octanal
- Other names Caprylic aldehyde Octanaldehyde; Aldehyde C-8

Identifiers
CAS Number	124-13-0
3D model (JSmol)	Interactive image
ChEBI	CHEBI:17935
ChemSpider	441
ECHA InfoCard	100.004.259
PubChem CID	454
UNII	XGE9999H19
CompTox Dashboard (EPA)	DTXSID3021643
- InChI: InChI=1S/C8H16O/c1-2-3-4-5-6-7-8-9/h8H,2-7H2,1H3 Key: NUJGJRNETVAIRJ-UHFFFAOYSA-N; InChI=1/C8H16O/c1-2-3-4-5-6-7-8-9/h8H,2-7H2,1H3 Key: NUJGJRNETVAIRJ-UHFFFAOYAK
- SMILES: CCCCCCCC=O

Properties
Chemical formula	C_{8}H_{16}O
Molar mass	128.215 g·mol^{−1}
Appearance	Colorless or lightly yellow liquid
Density	0.821 g/cm^{3}
Melting point	12 to 15 °C (54 to 59 °F; 285 to 288 K)
Boiling point	171 °C (340 °F; 444 K)
Solubility in water	Slightly soluble

Hazards
Flash point	51 °C (124 °F; 324 K)

Related compounds
Related aldehydes	Heptanal Nonanal
- Except where otherwise noted, data are given for materials in their standard state (at 25 °C [77 °F], 100 kPa). verify (what is ?) Infobox references

Octanal is the organic compound, an aldehyde, with the chemical formula CH_{3}(CH_{2})_{6}CHO. A colorless fragrant liquid with a fruit-like odor, it occurs naturally in citrus oils. It is used commercially as a component in perfumes and in flavor production for the food industry. It is usually produced by hydroformylation of heptene and the dehydrogenation of 1-octanol.

Octanal can also be referred to as caprylic aldehyde or C8 aldehyde.
