= Heptanal =

Chemical compound (C7H14O)

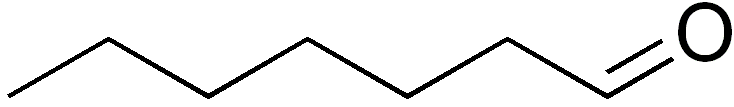

Names
- Preferred IUPAC name Heptanal
- Other names Heptanaldehyde; Aldehyde C-7; Enanthaldehyde; Heptyl aldehyde n-Heptanal

Identifiers
CAS Number	111-71-7
3D model (JSmol)	Interactive image
ChEBI	CHEBI:34787
ChEMBL	ChEMBL18104
ChemSpider	7838
ECHA InfoCard	100.003.545
KEGG	C14390
PubChem CID	8130
UNII	92N104S3HF
CompTox Dashboard (EPA)	DTXSID0021597
- InChI: InChI=1S/C7H14O/c1-2-3-4-5-6-7-8/h7H,2-6H2,1H3 Key: FXHGMKSSBGDXIY-UHFFFAOYSA-N; InChI=1/C7H14O/c1-2-3-4-5-6-7-8/h7H,2-6H2,1H3 Key: FXHGMKSSBGDXIY-UHFFFAOYAJ
- SMILES: O=CCCCCCC

Properties
Chemical formula	C_{7}H_{14}O
Molar mass	114.188 g·mol^{−1}
Appearance	Clear liquid
Density	0.80902 g/cm^{3} at 30 °C
Melting point	−43.3 °C (−45.9 °F; 229.8 K)
Boiling point	152.8 °C (307.0 °F; 425.9 K)
Solubility in water	Slightly soluble
Magnetic susceptibility (χ)	−81.02·10^{−6} cm^{3}/mol

Related compounds
Related aldehydes	Hexanal Octanal
- Except where otherwise noted, data are given for materials in their standard state (at 25 °C [77 °F], 100 kPa). verify (what is ?) Infobox references

Heptanal or heptanaldehyde is an alkyl aldehyde. It is a colourless liquid with a strong fruity odor, which is used as precursor to components in perfumes and lubricants.

== Production ==
The formation of heptanal in the fractional distillation of castor oil was already described in 1878. The large-scale production is based on the pyrolytic cleavage of ricinoleic acid (Arkema method) and on the hydroformylation of 1-hexene:

Heptanal naturally occurs in the essential oils of ylang-ylang (Cananga odorata), clary sage (Salvia sclarea), lemon (Citrus x limon), bitter orange (Citrus x aurantium), rose (Rosa) and hyacinth (Hyacinthus).

== Properties ==
Heptanal is a slightly volatile colorless liquid. It has a pervasive fruity to oily-greasy odor, It is miscible with alcohols but practically insoluble in water. Because of its sensitivity to oxidation, heptanal is stored under nitrogen and stabilized with 100 ppm hydroquinone.

Heptanal is flammable. The compound has a flash point of 39.5 °C. The explosion range is between 1.1% by volume as the lower explosion limit (LEL) and 5.2% by volume as the upper explosion limit. Its ignition temperature is 205 °C.

== Uses ==
Heptanal can be used for the production of 1-heptanol via hydrogenation:

The oxidation of heptanal with oxygen in the presence of a rhodium catalysts leads at 50 °C to heptanoic acid in 95% yield. Heptanal reacts with benzaldehyde in a Knoevenagel reaction under basic catalysis with high yield and selectivity (> 90%) to jasminaldehyde, which is mostly used in fragrances for its jasmine-like aroma as a cis/trans isomer mixture.

A by-product of the given reaction is the unpleasant rancid smelling (Z)-2-pentyl-2-nonenal. Nevertheless, heptanal can be converted into (Z)-2-pentyl-2-nonenal virtually quantitatively in the presence of aqueous boric acid upon azeotropic removal of water.

Full hydrogenation provides the branched primary alcohol 2-pentylnonan-1-ol, also accessible from the Guerbet reaction from heptanol.
