= C11H20O2 =

The molecular formula C_{11}H_{20}O_{2} may refer to:

- Buciclic_acid
- Citronellyl formate
- Ditetrahydrofurylpropane
- 2-Ethylhexyl acrylate
- trans-3-Methyl-4-decanolide
- 2,5-Undecanedione
- Undecylenic acid
