= C11H12O2 =

The molecular formula C_{11}H_{12}O_{2} (molar mass: 176.21 g/mol) may refer to:

- Allyl phenylacetate
- Centalun
- Cinnamyl acetate
- 2,2-Di-2-furylpropane
- Ethyl cinnamate
