= OR2W1 =

Protein-coding gene in the species Homo sapiens

Identifiers
- Aliases: OR2W1, hs6M1-15, olfactory receptor family 2 subfamily W member 1
- External IDs: MGI: 3030097; GeneCards: OR2W1

Gene location (Human)
Chr.	Chromosome 6 (human)
Band	6p22.1	Start	29,044,213 bp
Band	6p22.1	End	29,045,175 bp

Gene location (Mouse)
Chr.	Chromosome 13 (mouse)
Band	13|13 A3.1	Start	21,313,809 bp
Band	13|13 A3.1	End	21,320,466 bp
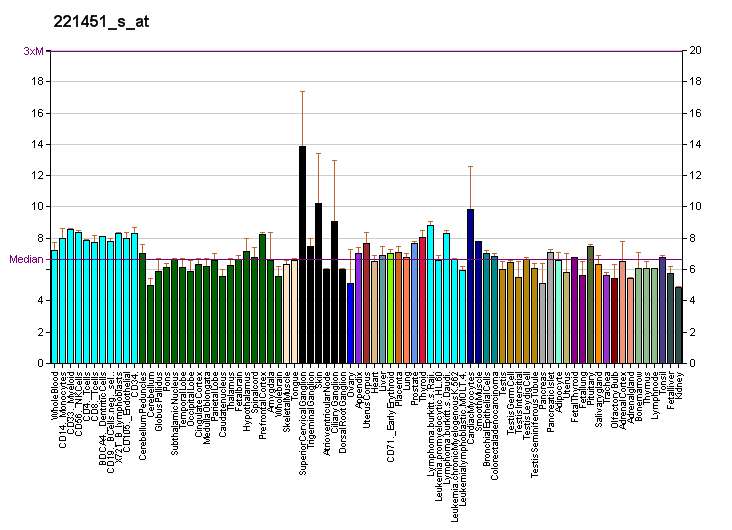
RNA expression pattern
Bgee	Human / Mouse (ortholog); Top expressed in: testicle; gonad; sural nerve / n/a; More reference expression data
BioGPS	More reference expression data
Gene ontology
Molecular function	G protein-coupled receptor activity; olfactory receptor activity; signal transducer activity
Cellular component	integral component of membrane; plasma membrane; membrane
Biological process	sensory perception of smell; signal transduction; response to stimulus; detection of chemical stimulus involved in sensory perception of smell; G protein-coupled receptor signaling pathway
Sources:Amigo / QuickGO
Orthologs
Databases	NCBI: entry; OMA: entry
Species	Human	Mouse
Entrez	26692	18341
Ensembl	ENSG00000204704; ENSG00000226463; ENSG00000206525; ENSG00000228977; ENSG00000228652 ENSG00000229328; ENSG00000227639; ENSG00000234101	ENSMUSG00000071522
UniProt	Q9Y3N9	Q7TQT8
RefSeq (mRNA)	NM_030903	NM_010984
RefSeq (protein)	NP_112165	NP_035114
Location (UCSC)	Chr 6: 29.04 – 29.05 Mb	Chr 13: 21.31 – 21.32 Mb
PubMed search
- Wikidata
View/Edit Human	View/Edit Mouse

Olfactory receptor 2W1 is a protein that in humans is encoded by the OR2W1 gene.

Olfactory receptors interact with odorant molecules in the nose, to initiate a neuronal response that triggers the perception of a smell. The olfactory receptor proteins are members of a large family of G-protein-coupled receptors (GPCR) arising from single coding-exon genes. Olfactory receptors share a 7-transmembrane domain structure with many neurotransmitter and hormone receptors and are responsible for the recognition and G protein-mediated transduction of odorant signals. The olfactory receptor gene family is the largest in the genome. The nomenclature assigned to the olfactory receptor genes and proteins for this organism is independent of other organisms.

== Ligands ==
Out of 10 human ORs studied, OR2W1 was the most broadly tuned, meaning it responds to the greatest variety of different odorant molecules.

Ligands, in decreasing order of sensitivity:

- 2-Heptanone
- 1-Octanal
- (-)-Citronellol
- Hexanal
- 3-Octanone
- Hexyl acetate
- 1-Hexanol
- Octanoic acid
- 1-Heptanol
- Allyl phenylacetate
- Benzyl acetate
- 3,4-Hexanedione

== See also ==
- Olfactory receptor
