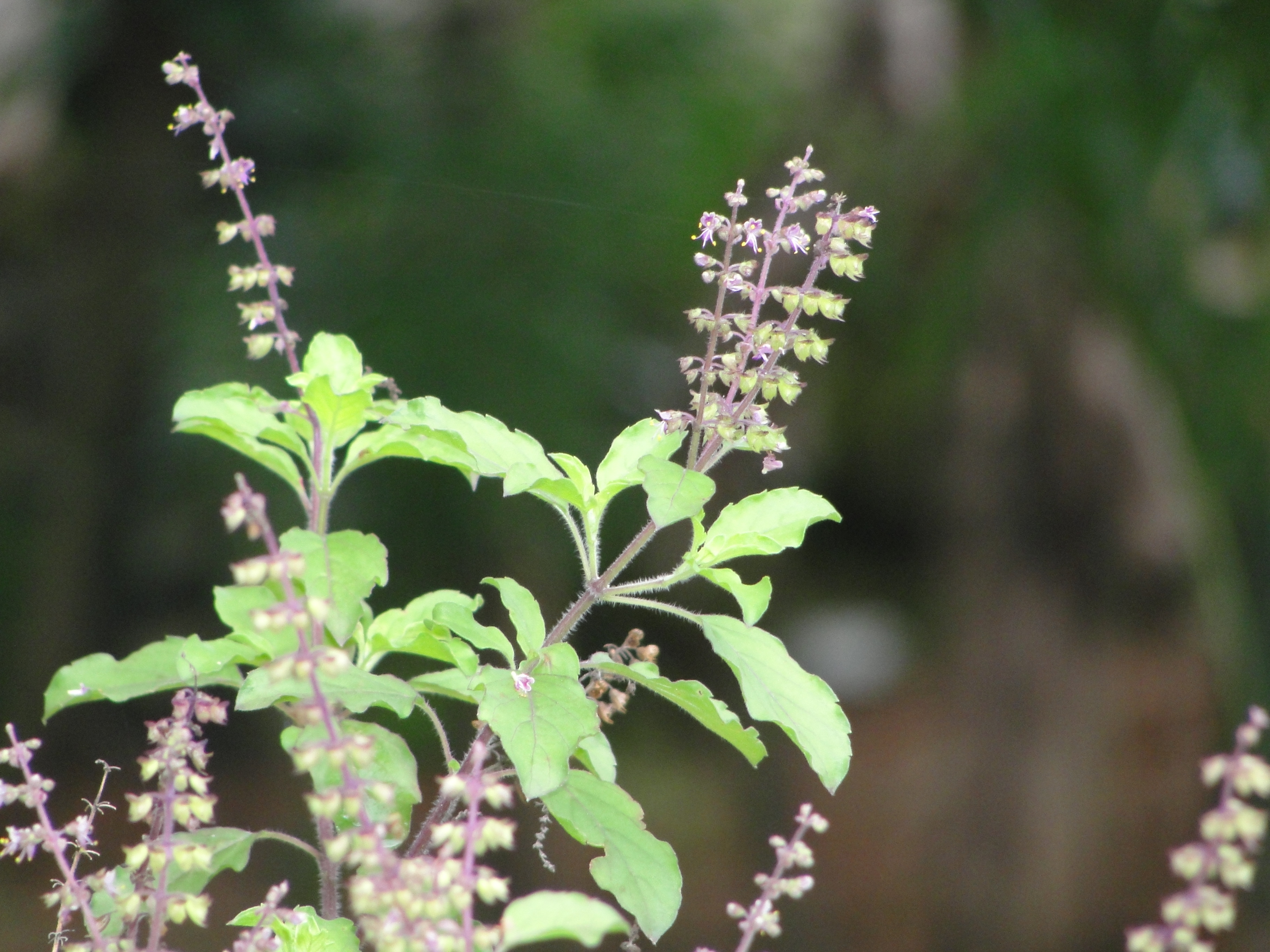

Scientific classification
- Kingdom: Plantae
- Clade: Tracheophytes
- Clade: Angiosperms
- Clade: Eudicots
- Clade: Asterids
- Order: Lamiales
- Family: Lamiaceae
- Genus: Ocimum
- Species: O. tenuiflorum

Binomial name
- Ocimum tenuiflorum L.

Synonyms
- Geniosporum tenuiflorum (L.) Merr.; Lumnitzera tenuiflora (L.) Spreng.; Moschosma tenuiflorum (L.) Heynh.; Ocimum hirsutum Benth.; Ocimum inodorum Burm.f.; Ocimum monachorum L.; Ocimum sanctum L.; Ocimum subserratum B.Heyne ex Hook.f.; Ocimum tomentosum Lam.; Plectranthus monachorum (L.) Spreng.

= Ocimum tenuiflorum =

Species of flowering plant

Ocimum tenuiflorum, commonly known as tulasi, tulsi, or holy basil, is an aromatic perennial plant in the family Lamiaceae. It is widely cultivated throughout the Southeast Asian tropics. It is native to tropical and subtropical regions of Asia, Australia and the western Pacific. This plant has escaped from cultivation and has naturalized in many tropical regions of the Americas. It is an agricultural and environmental weed.

Tulasi is cultivated for religious and traditional medicine purposes, and also for its essential oil. It is widely used as an herbal tea, commonly used in Ayurveda. It has a place within the Vaishnava tradition of Hinduism, in which devotees perform worship involving the plant or its leaves.

== Morphology ==
Holy basil is an erect, many-branched subshrub, 30–60 cm (12–24 in) tall with hairy stems. Leaves are green or purple; they are simple, petioled, with an ovate blade up to 5 cm (2 in) long, which usually has a slightly toothed margin; they are strongly scented and have a decussate phyllotaxy. The purplish flowers are placed in close whorls on elongated racemes.

The three main morphotypes cultivated in India and Nepal are Ram tulsi (the most common type, with broad bright green leaves that are slightly sweet), the less common purplish green-leaved (Krishna or Shyama tulsi) and the common wild vana tulsi (e.g., Ocimum gratissimum).

== Phytochemicals ==
The plant and its oil contain diverse phytochemicals, including tannins, flavonoids, eugenol, caryophyllenes, carvacrol, linalool, camphor, and cinnamyl acetate, among others. One study reported that the plant contains an eponymous family of 10 neolignan compounds called tulsinol A-J.

Essential oil compositions and aroma levels vary among holy basil genotypes. Some studies report specific aroma compounds in the essential oil as camphor (32%), eucalyptol (19%), ⍺-bisabolene (17%), eugenol (14%), germacrene (11%) and β-bisabolene (11%). In addition, more than 60 different aroma compounds were found through gas chromatography–mass spectrometry analysis of holy basil. However, other studies have stated tulsi essential oil consists mostly of eugenol (70%) β-elemene (11%), β-caryophyllene (8%), and germacrene (2%), with the balance being made up of various trace compounds, mostly terpenes.

== Uses ==
=== Culinary ===
==== Thai cuisine ====
The leaves of holy basil, known as kaphrao in the Thai language (กะเพรา), are commonly used in Thai cuisine for certain stir-fries and curries such as phat kaphrao (ผัดกะเพรา) — a stir-fry of Thai holy basil with meats, seafood or, as in khao phat kraphao, with rice. Two different types of holy basil are used in Thailand, a "red" variant which tends to be more pungent, and a "white" version for seafood dishes. Kaphrao should not be confused with horapha (โหระพา), which is normally known as Thai basil, or with Thai lemon basil (maenglak; แมงลัก).

==== Minangkabau cuisine ====
Holy basil (in Minangkabau language and Indonesian language are known as ruku-ruku) is also widely used for Minangkabau dishes, particularly for its gulai variety, which involves fish as the primary source of protein. These Minangkabau fish gulais that commonly use holy basil such as gulai ikan mas (carp gulai), gulai ikan kakap (red snapper gulai), gulai kepala ikan kakap (red snapper's head gulai), samba ikan gadang or pangek (braised fish gulai), and gulai telur ikan (fish roe gulai). Holy basil leaves are used to enhance flavour.

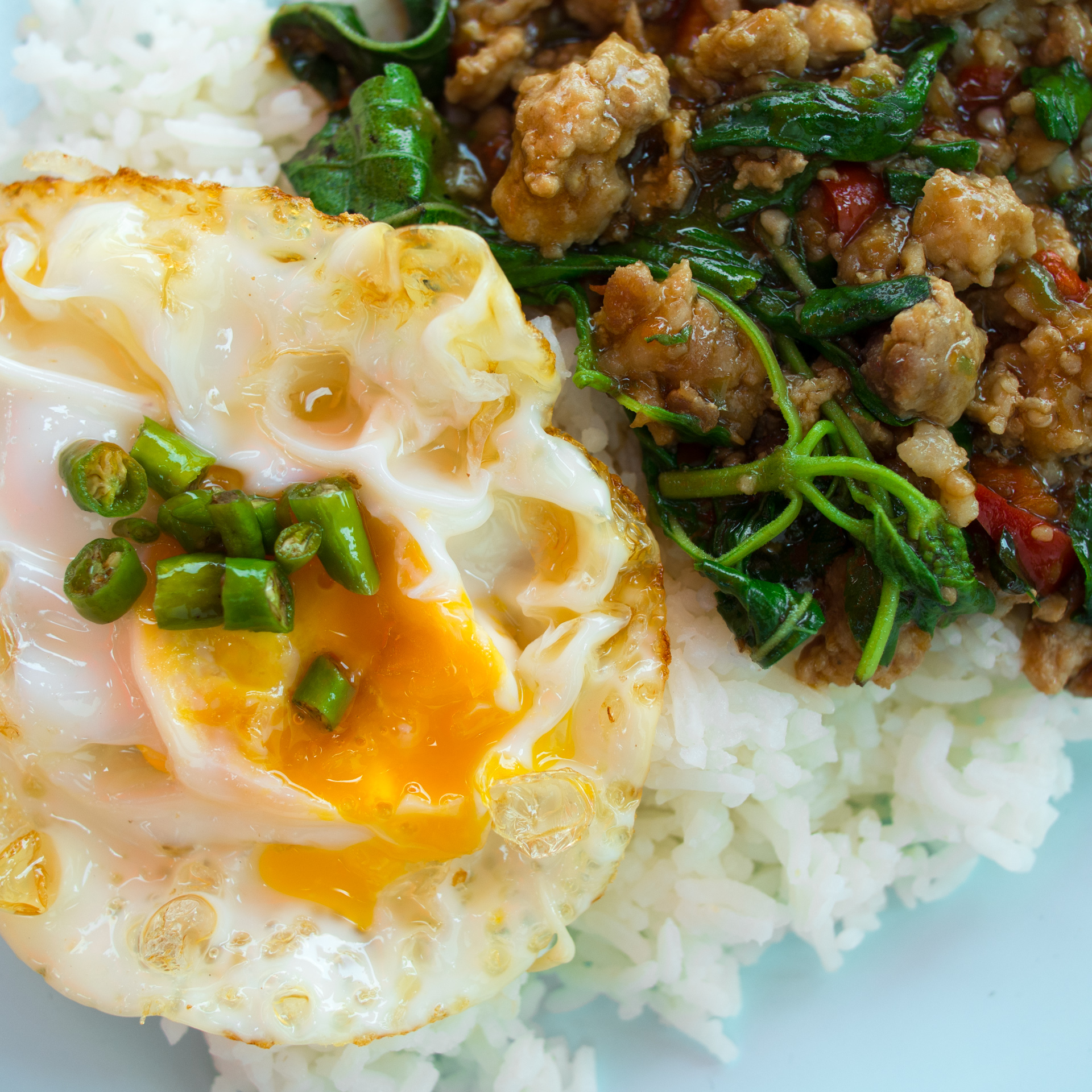
Phat kaphrao mu – Thai holy basil with pork – a common dish in Thailand.

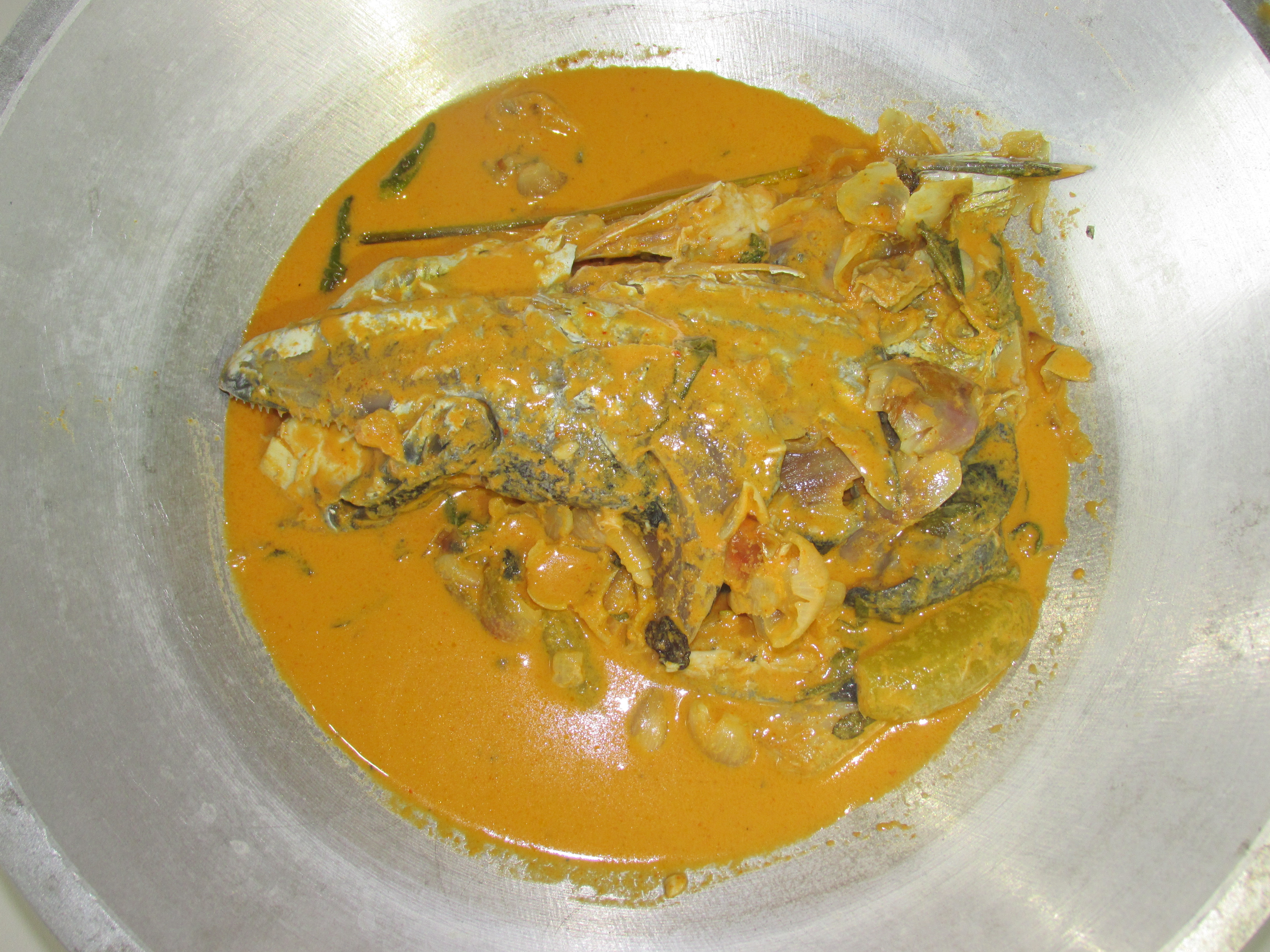
A plate of gulai kepala ikan (fish head's gulai) accompanied by ruku-ruku, slices of blimbi wuluh (Averrhoa bilimbi) and green cabai rawit (bird's eye chilies).

=== Insect repellent ===
For centuries, the dried leaves have been mixed with stored grains to repel insects.

=== Nematicidal ===
The essential oil may have nematicidal properties against Tylenchulus semipenetrans, Meloidogyne javanica, Anguina tritici, and Heterodera cajani.

== In Hinduism ==
Tulasi may be planted in courtyards of Hindu houses or temples to Hanuman. The ritual lighting of lamps each evening during Kartik includes the worship of the tulsi plant. Vaishnavites are also known as "those who bear the tulsi around the neck".

Tulasi Vivaha is a ceremonial festival performed between Prabodhini Ekadashi (the 11th or 12th lunar day of the bright fortnight of the Hindu month of Kartika) and Kartik Purnima (the full moon of the month). It is a ceremonial marriage of the tulsi plant to the Hindu deity Vishnu, in the form of Shaligram. On this auspicious day families dress up the tulsi plant like a bride, decorate the mandap around it, and perform the ritual like kanyadaan. During the Kati Bihu festival celebrated in Assam, people light earthen lamps (diya) at the foot of the household tulsi plants.

Tulasi has been used in Ayurvedic and Siddha practices for its supposed medicinal properties.

== Gallery ==
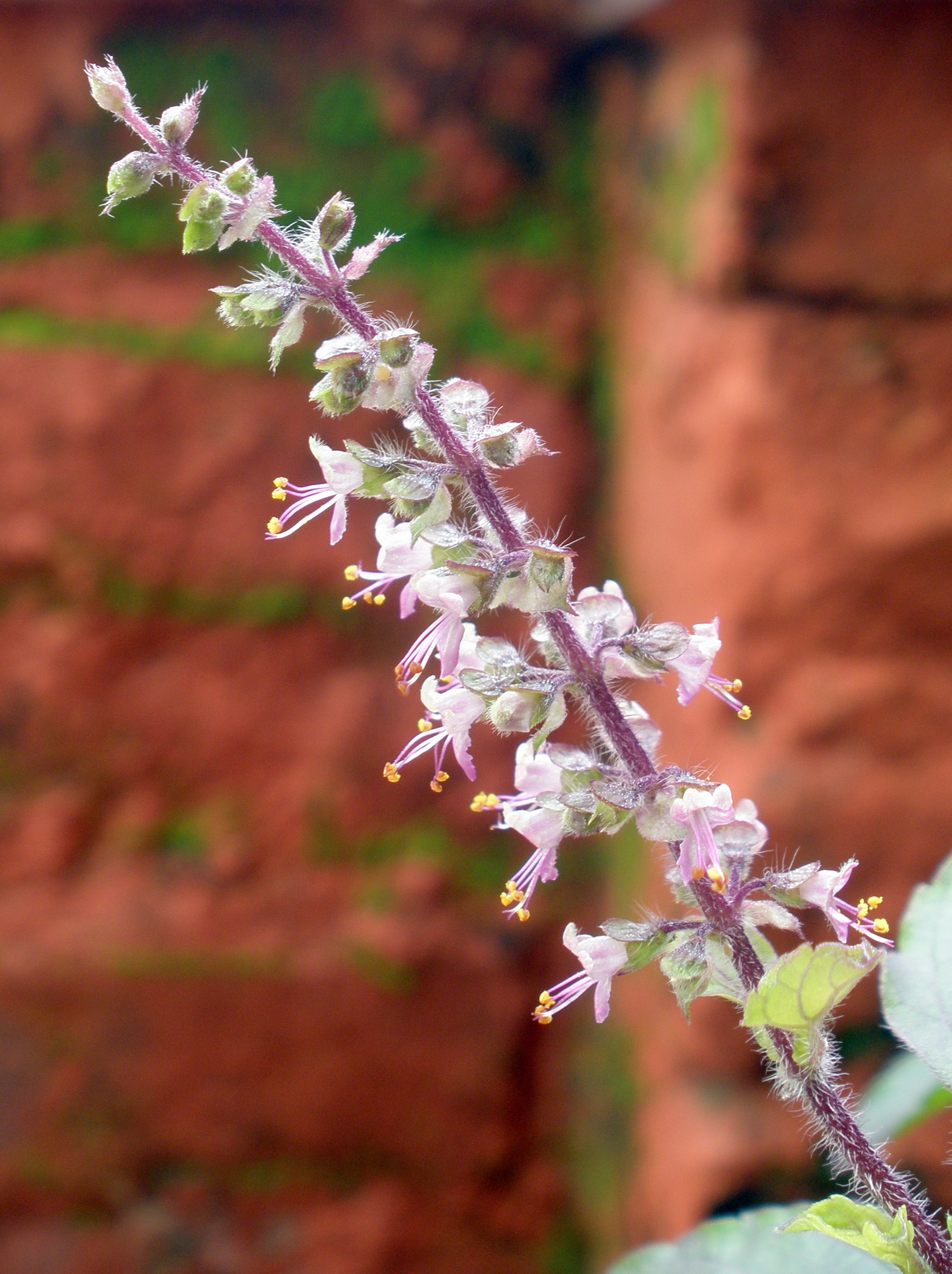
Flowers

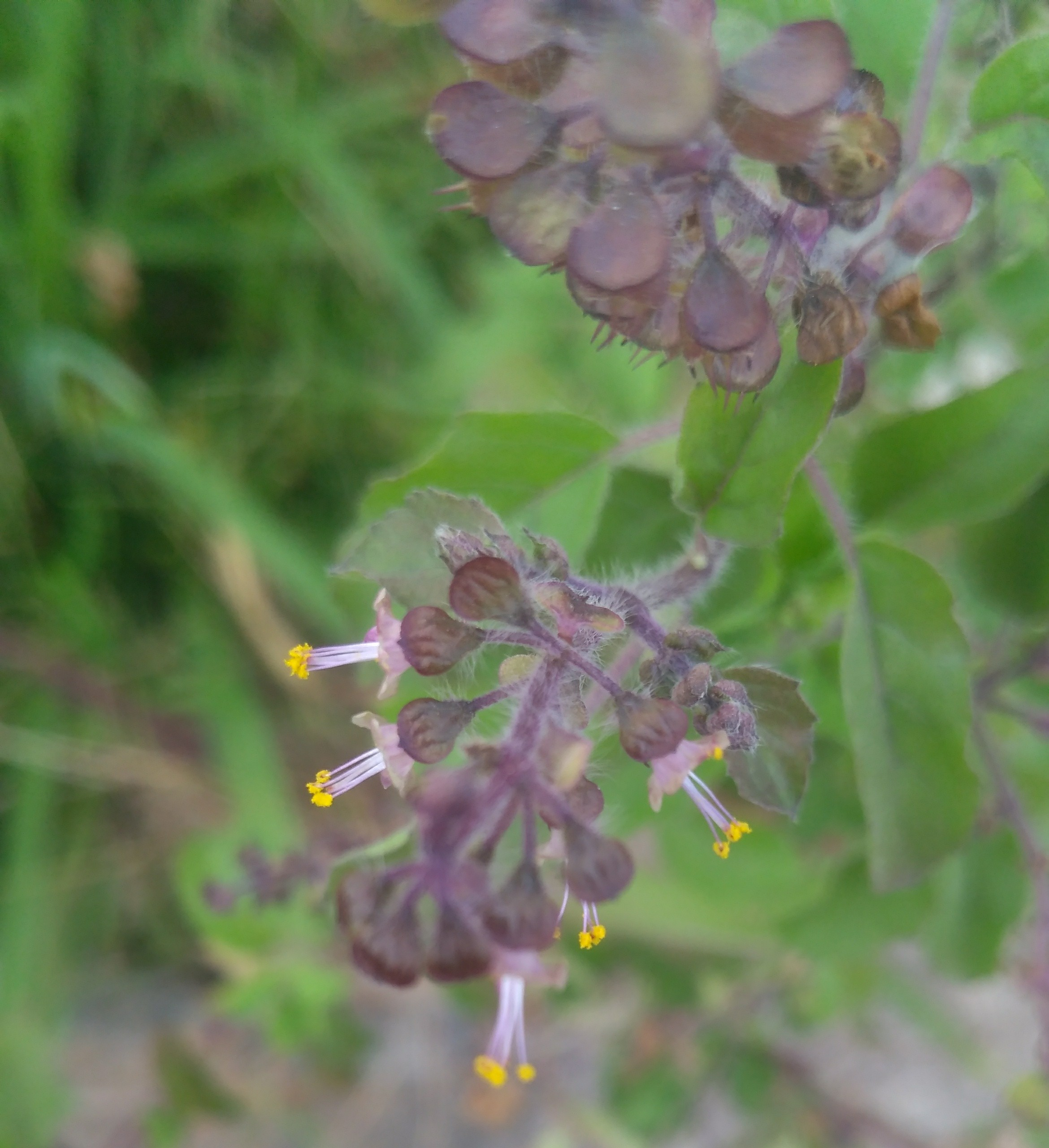
Inflorescence

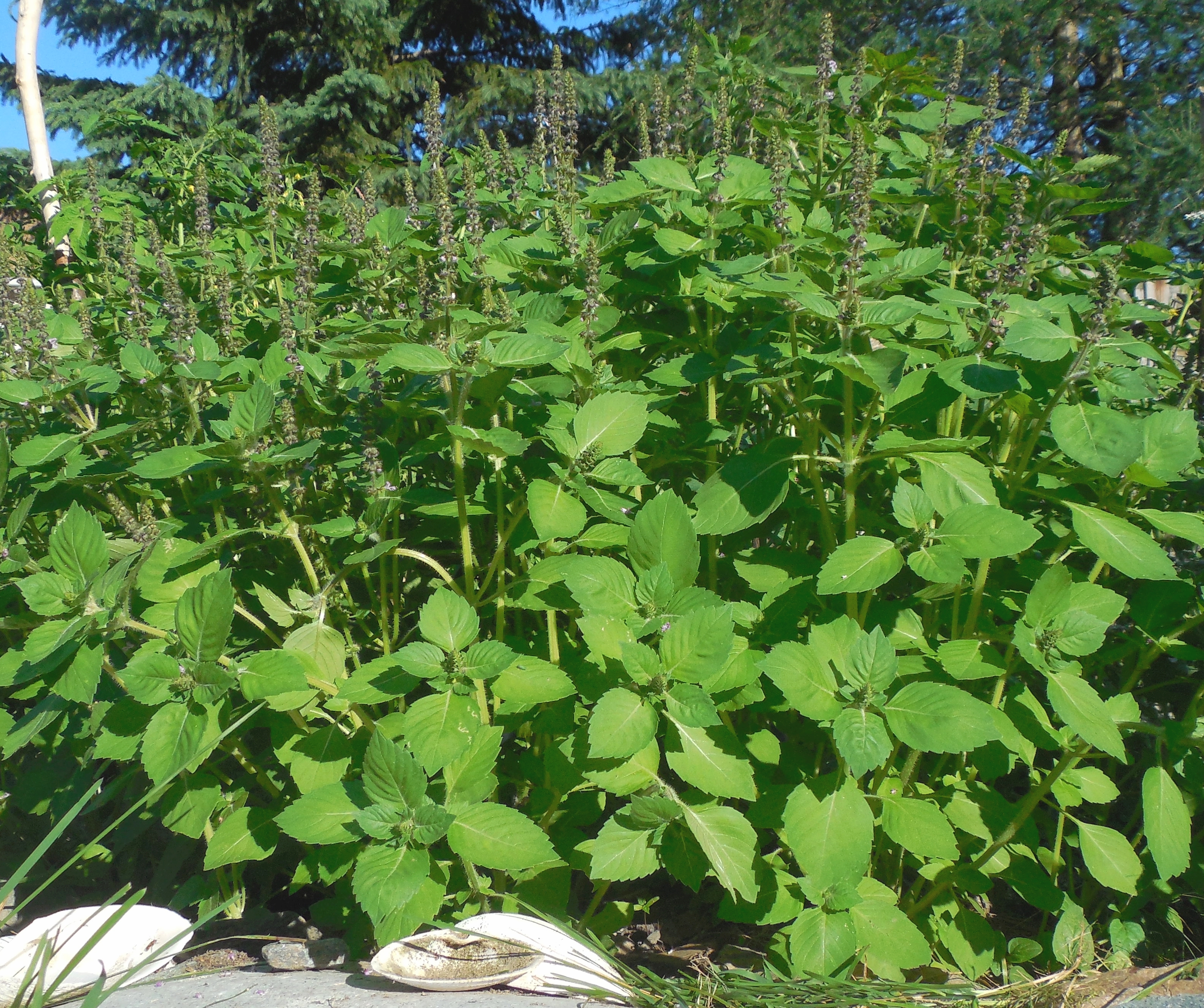
Leaves of Ocimum tenuiflorum L.

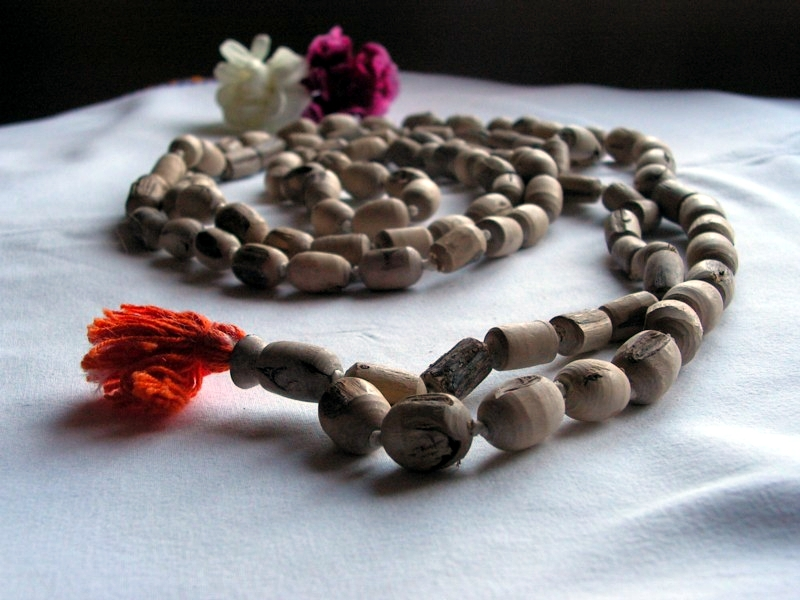
Prayer beads made from tulsi wood

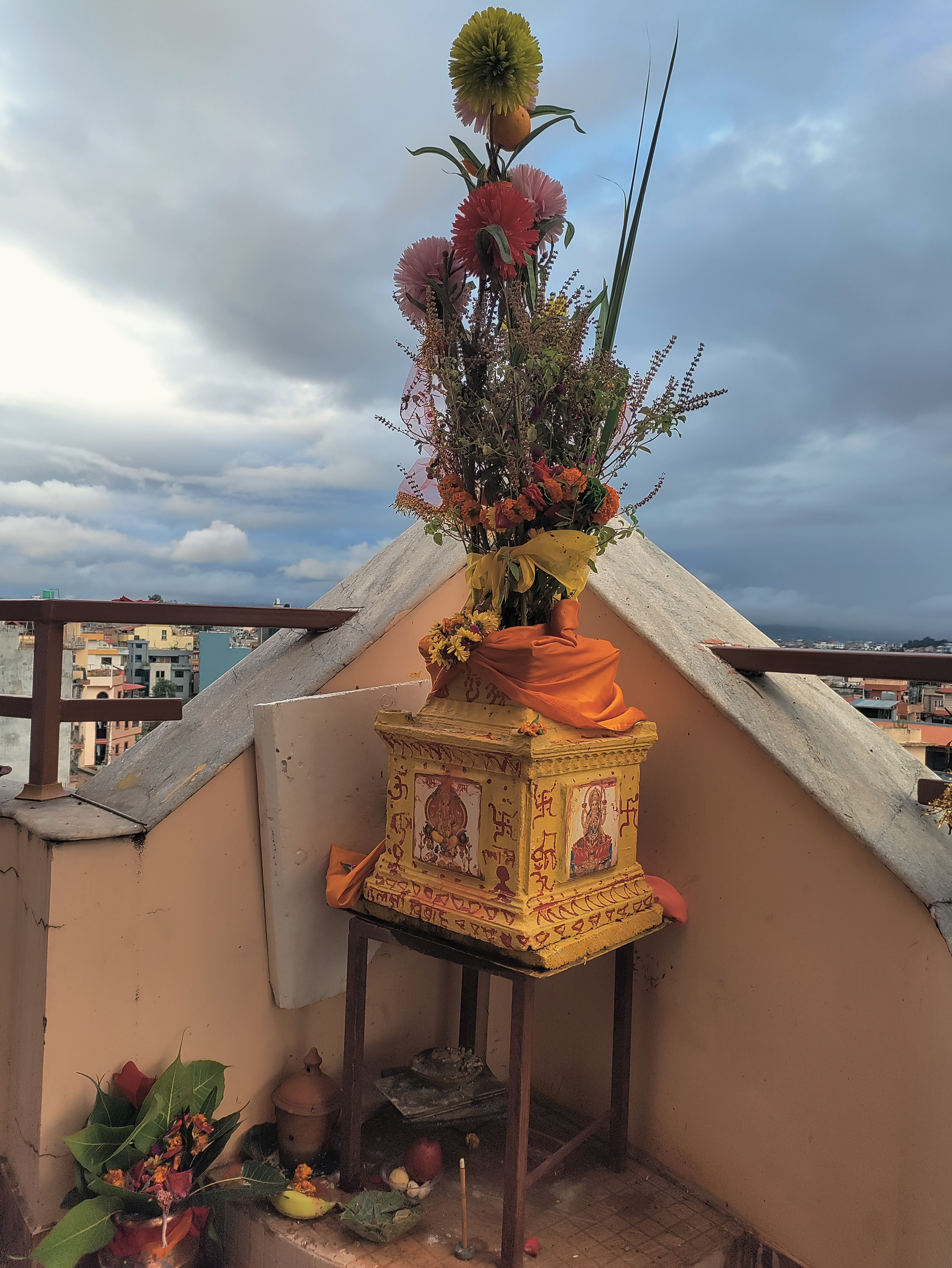
Holy basil's monastery in a house in Kathmandu, Nepal

== See also ==
- Sacred trees
- Sacred groves
- Phat kaphrao
- Tulsi Gabbard, named for the plant
