= OR51L1 =

Protein-coding gene in the species Homo sapiens

Identifiers
- Aliases: OR51L1, OR11-31, olfactory receptor family 51 subfamily L member 1
- External IDs: GeneCards: OR51L1

Gene location (Human)
Chr.	Chromosome 11 (human)
Band	11p15.4	Start	4,994,851 bp
Band	11p15.4	End	5,005,536 bp
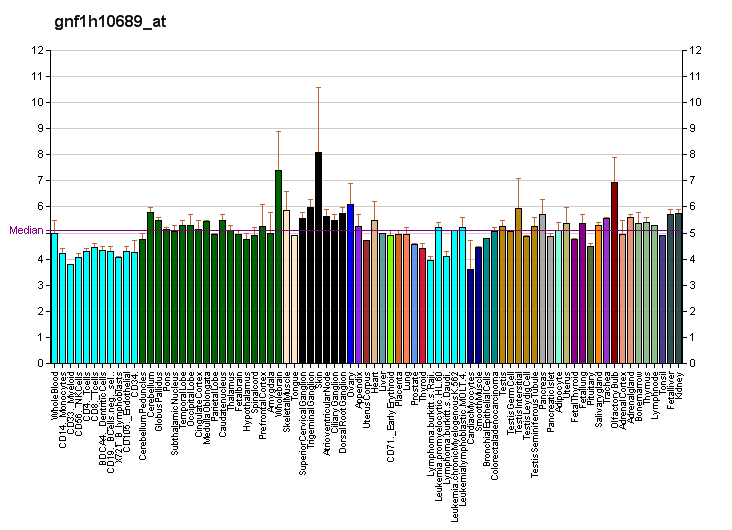

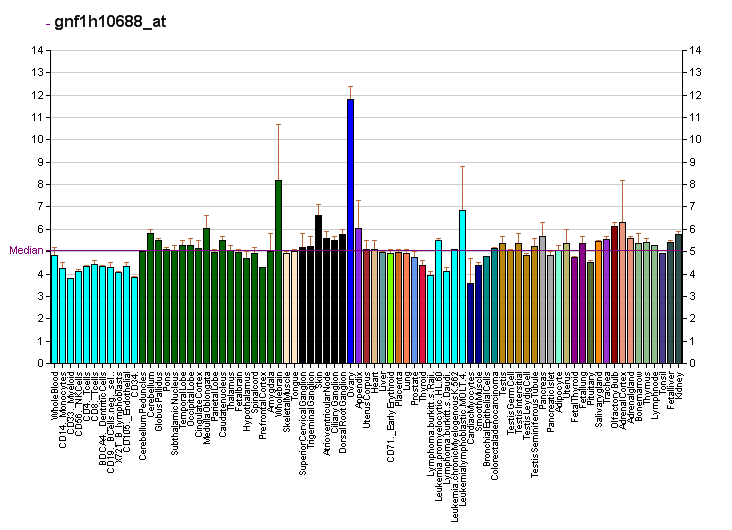
RNA expression pattern
Bgee	Human / Mouse (ortholog); Top expressed in: epithelium of colon; prostate / n/a; More reference expression data
BioGPS	More reference expression data
Gene ontology
Molecular function	G protein-coupled receptor activity; olfactory receptor activity; signal transducer activity
Cellular component	integral component of membrane; plasma membrane; membrane
Biological process	sensory perception of smell; signal transduction; response to stimulus; detection of chemical stimulus involved in sensory perception of smell; G protein-coupled receptor signaling pathway
Sources:Amigo / QuickGO
Orthologs
Databases	NCBI: entry; OMA: entry
Species	Human	Mouse
Entrez	119682	n/a
Ensembl	ENSG00000176798	n/a
UniProt	Q8NGJ5	n/a
RefSeq (mRNA)	NM_001004755	n/a
RefSeq (protein)	NP_001004755	n/a
Location (UCSC)	Chr 11: 4.99 – 5.01 Mb	n/a
PubMed search		n/a
- Wikidata
View/Edit Human

Olfactory receptor 51L1 is a protein that in humans is encoded by the OR51L1 gene.

Olfactory receptors interact with odorant molecules in the nose, to initiate a neuronal response that triggers the perception of a smell. The olfactory receptor proteins are members of a large family of G-protein-coupled receptors (GPCR) arising from single coding-exon genes. Olfactory receptors share a 7-transmembrane domain structure with many neurotransmitter and hormone receptors and are responsible for the recognition and G protein-mediated transduction of odorant signals. The olfactory receptor gene family is the largest in the genome. The nomenclature assigned to the olfactory receptor genes and proteins for this organism is independent of other organisms.

== Ligands ==
- Allyl phenylacetate
- Hexanoic acid

== See also ==
- Olfactory receptor
