= Ditetrahydrofurylpropane =

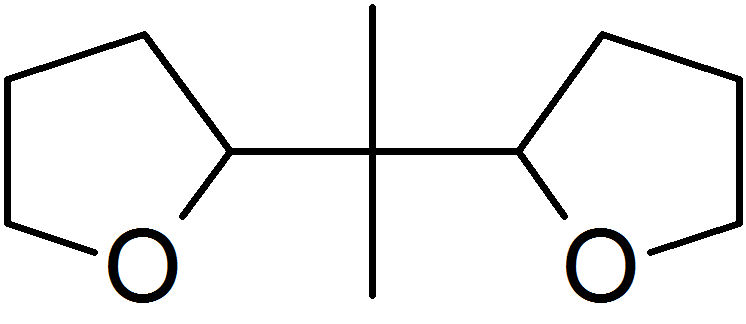

Names
- Preferred IUPAC name 2,2′-(Propane-2,2-diyl)bis(oxolane)
- Other names 2,2-Di(tetrahydrofuryl)propane

Identifiers
CAS Number	89686-69-1
3D model (JSmol)	Interactive image
ChemSpider	2342960
ECHA InfoCard	100.239.226
EC Number	700-263-8
PubChem CID	551484
CompTox Dashboard (EPA)	DTXSID10869029
- InChI: InChI=1S/C11H20O2/c1-11(2,9-5-3-7-12-9)10-6-4-8-13-10/h9-10H,3-8H2,1-2H3 Key: FZLHAQMQWDDWFI-UHFFFAOYSA-N
- SMILES: CC(C)(C1CCCO1)C2CCCO2

Properties
Chemical formula	C_{11}H_{20}O_{2}
Molar mass	184.279 g·mol^{−1}
Boiling point	145 to 146 °C (293 to 295 °F; 418 to 419 K) (58 mm Hg)

Hazards
- GHS labelling
Pictograms	(GHS02: Flammable) (GHS07: Exclamation mark)
Signal word	Warning
Hazard statements	H226, H302, H317, H319
Precautionary statements	P210, P233, P240, P241, P242, P243, P261, P264, P270, P272, P280, P301+P312, P302+P352, P303+P361+P353, P305+P351+P338, P321, P330, P333+P313, P337+P313, P363, P370+P378, P403+P235, P501
- Except where otherwise noted, data are given for materials in their standard state (at 25 °C [77 °F], 100 kPa). Infobox references

Ditetrahydrofurylpropane is a colorless liquid boiling at 145-146 °C at 60 mm Hg. It may be prepared by hydrogenation of 2,2-di-2-furylpropane. Consideration of the structure of ditetrahydrofurylpropane, DTHFP suggests that this molecule may exist as various stereoisomers depending on the orientation of the two H atoms adjacent to the isopropylidene bridging unit. The meso form (absolute configuration SR or RS) is symmetrical, while the stereoisomers (of absolute configuration SS and RR) represent a racemic pair.

== Synonyms ==
Furan, 2,2'-(1-methylethylidene)bis[tetrahydro-2,2-Bis(2-oxolanyl)propane 2,2-Bis(2-tetrahydrofuryl)propane 2,2'-Isopropylidenebis(tetrahydrofuran) Bistetrahydrofurylpropane DTHFP

== Synthesis ==
Ditetrahydrofurylpropane was synthesized in 1986 by Huffman via hydrogenation of 2,2-di-2-furylpropane. Vacuum distilled 2,2-di-2-furylpropane may be hydrogenated in nearly quantitative yield in alcohol solvents employing palladium on carbon or rhodium on carbon catalysts. Typical reaction times are a few hours at moderate temperatures at 100-800 psig hydrogen pressure.

== Applications ==
Ditetrahydrofurylpropane (DTHFP) has found application as a rubber additive in the manufacture of high vinyl content rubber for high performance tires. DTHFP functions as an anionic polymerization catalyst modifier allowing the preparation of rubber of high vinyl content.

Since the meso and racemic forms of DTHFP are diastereomeric, they have different physical properties and, in principle, can be separated by physical methods. In fact, the diastereomeric forms of DTHFP have been separated by column chromatography over silica gel. The symmetrical, meso form of DTHFP was found to be significantly more effective in increasing the vinyl content of rubber than the racemic form.
