= 2,5-Undecanedione =

- Structural formula of 2,5-Undecanedione

Names
- Preferred IUPAC name Undecane-2,5-dione

Identifiers
CAS Number	7018-92-0
3D model (JSmol)	Interactive image
ChemSpider	73524
ECHA InfoCard	100.027.544
EC Number	230-297-4
PubChem CID	81489
UNII	F8UB9Q3X7Y
CompTox Dashboard (EPA)	DTXSID50220458
- InChI: InChI=1S/C11H20O2/c1-3-4-5-6-7-11(13)9-8-10(2)12/h3-9H2,1-2H3 Key: ZHMCDZHVHDFSHO-UHFFFAOYSA-N
- SMILES: CCCCCCC(=O)CCC(=O)C

Properties
Chemical formula	C_{11}H_{20}O_{2}
Molar mass	184.279 g·mol^{−1}
- Except where otherwise noted, data are given for materials in their standard state (at 25 °C [77 °F], 100 kPa). Infobox references

2,5-Undecanedione is a γ-diketone in which the two carbonyl groups are separated by two methylene groups.

== Synthesis ==
Heinz Hunsdiecker described the synthesis of 2,5-undecanedione from 5-methylfurfural in 1942. 5-Methylfurfural 1 is first reacted with methyl propyl ketone 2 in an aldol condensation reaction to form an α,β-unsaturated carbonyl compound 3. The double bond of the side chain condensation product is reduced with sodium amalgam. The intermediate 4 is then converted to 2-methyl-5-hexylfuran 5 in a Wolff-Kishner reduction using hydrazine. An acid-catalyzed reaction at 120 °C (248 °F) cleaves the furan ring, producing 2,5-undecanedione 6.

An alternative route of synthesis starts with heptanal 1. First, the carbonyl group is protected with 1,3-propanedithiol 2, producing a dithiane 3. The dithiane is deprotonated using n-Butyllithium in tetrahydrofuran, and alkylated using 1,3-dichloro-2-butene 4 to give the intermediate 5. Hydrolysis of the dithioacetal protecting group with concentrated sulfuric acid yields 2,5-undecanedione 6, which can be worked up and purified using Girard's reagent T in methanol.

== Uses ==
2,5-Undecanedione is used in the Hunsdiecker condensation, a reaction developed by Heinz Hunsdiecker in 1942 to produce cyclopentenones from γ-ketones, in sodium hydroxide solution to produce the fragrance dihydrojasmone:
