= Dihydrojasmone =

Names
- Preferred IUPAC name 3-Methyl-2-pentylcyclopent-2-en-1-one

Identifiers
CAS Number	1128-08-1
3D model (JSmol)	Interactive image
ChemSpider	56166
ECHA InfoCard	100.013.122
PubChem CID	62378
UNII	Y953R7PP90
CompTox Dashboard (EPA)	DTXSID4051584
- InChI: InChI=1S/C11H18O/c1-3-4-5-6-10-9(2)7-8-11(10)12/h3-8H2,1-2H3 Key: YCIXWYOBMVNGTB-UHFFFAOYSA-N
- SMILES: CCCCCC1=C(CCC1=O)C

Properties
Chemical formula	C_{11}H_{18}O
Molar mass	166.264 g·mol^{−1}
Appearance	Colorless to pale yellow clear liquid
Boiling point	112 °C (234 °F; 385 K)
- Except where otherwise noted, data are given for materials in their standard state (at 25 °C [77 °F], 100 kPa). (what is ?) Infobox references

Dihydrojasmone is an aroma compound with the chemical formula C_{11}H_{18}O. It has a fruity, jasmine odor with woody and herbal undertones. Perfumery uses include natural green, woody, lavender and bergamot. Dihydrojasmone is found in citrus and in bergamot orange oil. Dihydrojasmone belongs to the family of ketones.
