= Centalun =

Chemical compound

Clinical data
- ATC code: none

Legal status
- Legal status: In general: unscheduled

Identifiers
- IUPAC name: 2-methyl-1-phenylbut-3-yne-1,2-diol
- CAS Number: 2033-94-5
- PubChem CID: 16252
- ChemSpider: 15421
- UNII: 3N20VGJ39Y
- CompTox Dashboard (EPA): DTXSID50942486

Chemical and physical data
- Formula: C_{11}H_{12}O_{2}
- Molar mass: 176.215 g·mol^{−1}
- 3D model (JSmol): Interactive image
- SMILES: OC(c1ccccc1)C(C#C)(O)C
- InChI: InChI=1S/C11H12O2/c1-3-11(2,13)10(12)9-7-5-4-6-8-9/h1,4-8,10,12-13H,2H3; Key:GQOXDWHRXDPZJK-UHFFFAOYSA-N

Centalun was developed by Boehringer Ingelheim in 1962 and is a psycholeptic drug with hypnotic and sedative effects, via allosteric agonism of the GABA_{A} receptor. It was previously used for sedation in medical procedures such as surgery, orthopedics and gynecology, although it is no longer in clinical use. Despite its history of clinical use, centalun was never incorporated into the CSA and therefore remains unregulated as a drug of abuse.
