= Citronellyl formate =

Names
- IUPAC name 3,7-dimethyloct-6-enyl formate

Identifiers
CAS Number	105-85-1
3D model (JSmol)	Interactive image
ChEBI	CHEBI:31406
ChEMBL	ChEMBL3184928
ChemSpider	7490
ECHA InfoCard	100.003.036
EC Number	203-338-9
KEGG	C12295
PubChem CID	7778
UNII	7B1MY2BRDK
CompTox Dashboard (EPA)	DTXSID1044772
- InChI: InChI=1S/C11H20O2/c1-10(2)5-4-6-11(3)7-8-13-9-12/h5,9,11H,4,6-8H2,1-3H3 Key: DZNVIZQPWLDQHI-UHFFFAOYSA-N
- SMILES: CC(CCC=C(C)C)CCOC=O

Properties
Chemical formula	C_{11}H_{20}O_{2}
Molar mass	184.279 g·mol^{−1}
Appearance	colourless
Odor	strong, fruity, floral
Density	0.897 g/cm^{3}
Boiling point	235 °C (455 °F; 508 K)
Solubility in water	insoluble
Solubility	soluble in alcohol, most fixed oils slightly soluble in propylene glycol insoluble in glycerin
log P	3.800
Refractive index (n_{D})	1.443-1.452

Hazards
- GHS labelling
Pictograms	(GHS07: Exclamation mark)
Signal word	Warning
Hazard statements	H315, H317
Precautionary statements	P261, P264, P272, P280, P302+P352, P321, P333+P317, P362+P364, P501
- Except where otherwise noted, data are given for materials in their standard state (at 25 °C [77 °F], 100 kPa). Infobox references

Citronellyl formate is a terpenoid ester derived from citronellol and formic acid.

== Occurrence ==
Citronellyl formate is an important component of geranium oil from Pelargonium graveolens. In two studies, its concentration was around 10% (9.7% and 11%). Citronellyl formate is also found in kumquats, albeit in small amounts, but it is a characteristic component.

== Usage ==
The compound is used as a fragrance, with worldwide usage in this area ranging from 10 to 100 tonnes per year. In the EU, it is approved under FL number 09.078 as a general food flavoring and may contain citronellol for this application.
