= Trans-3-Methyl-4-decanolide =

trans-3-Methyl-4-decanolide
- (4R,5S)-trans-3-Methyl-4-decanolide

- (4S,5R)-trans-3-Methyl-4-decanolide

Names
- IUPAC names (4R,5S)-5-Hexyl-4-methyldihydrofuran-2(3H)-one (4S,5R)-5-Hexyl-4-methyldihydrofuran-2(3H)-one

Identifiers
| CAS Number | 147254-33-9 (racemate) |
| 3D model (JSmol) | (4R,5S): Interactive image; (4S,5R): Interactive image |
| ChemSpider | 24765174 (4S,5R); 24765175 (4R,5S) |
| PubChem CID | 12839888 |
| UNII | XN9I5FD92J (racemate) |
| CompTox Dashboard (EPA) | DTXSID001029637 |
- InChI: InChI=1S/C11H20O2/c1-3-4-5-6-7-10-9(2)8-11(12)13-10/h9-10H,3-8H2,1-2H3/t9-,10+/m0/s1 Key: XNRLAEXLQFIKEY-VHSXEESVSA-N; (4R,5S): InChI=1S/C11H20O2/c1-3-4-5-6-7-10-9(2)8-11(12)13-10/h9-10H,3-8H2,1-2H3/t9-,10+/m1/s1 Key: XNRLAEXLQFIKEY-ZJUUUORDSA-N
- SMILES: (4R,5S): C[C@H]1[C@H](CCCCCC)OC(C1)=O; (4S,5R): C[C@@H]1[C@@H](CCCCCC)OC(C1)=O

Properties
| Chemical formula | C_{11}H_{20}O_{2} |
| Molar mass | 184.279 g·mol^{−1} |
- Except where otherwise noted, data are given for materials in their standard state (at 25 °C [77 °F], 100 kPa). verify (what is ?) Infobox references

trans-3-Methyl-4-decanolide is a chemical compound with formula C_{11}H_{20}O_{2}, found in clary sage, in the juice of the blood orange, and in the extract of mandarin peel. It is a lactone with coconut-like odor.

The cis isomer is found in an African orchid.

== See also ==
- trans-3-Methyl-4-octanolide, flavor component of oak-aged liquors.
