= Cinnamyl acetate =

Names
- IUPAC name 3-phenylprop-2-enyl acetate
- Other names Cinnamyl acetate; 3-Phenylprop-2-en-1-yl acetate; 3-Phenylallyl acetate; 1-Acetoxy-3-phenyl-2-propene

Identifiers
CAS Number	21040-45-9; 103-54-8 (non-specific)
3D model (JSmol)	Interactive image
ChEBI	CHEBI:31402
ChemSpider	7377
ECHA InfoCard	100.002.838
EC Number	203-121-9
KEGG	C12299
PubChem CID	5282110
RTECS number	GE2275000
UNII	LFJ36XSV8K
CompTox Dashboard (EPA)	DTXSID2044765
- InChI: InChI=1S/C11H12O2/c1-10(12)13-9-5-8-11-6-3-2-4-7-11/h2-8H,9H2,1H3/b8-5+ Key: WJSDHUCWMSHDCR-VMPITWQZSA-N
- SMILES: CC(=O)OC/C=C/c1ccccc1

Properties
Chemical formula	C_{11}H_{12}O_{2}
Molar mass	176.215 g·mol^{−1}
Appearance	Colorless liquid
Odor	Sweet, floral, balsamic odor
Density	1.057 g/mL
Boiling point	265 °C (509 °F; 538 K)
Solubility in water	212.3 mg/L
log P	2.85
Vapor pressure	0.008 mm Hg (20 °C)
Refractive index (n_{D})	1.539 - 1.543

Hazards
- Occupational safety and health (OHS/OSH)
Main hazards	Causes eye irritation, may cause an allergic skin reaction
- GHS labelling
Pictograms	(GHS07: Exclamation mark)
Signal word	Warning
Hazard statements	H317, H319
Precautionary statements	P261, P264, P272, P280, P302+P352, P305+P351+P338, P321, P333+P313, P337+P313, P363, P501
NFPA 704 (fire diamond)	2 1 0
Flash point	103–113 °C (217–235 °F; 376–386 K)
- Except where otherwise noted, data are given for materials in their standard state (at 25 °C [77 °F], 100 kPa). verify (what is ?) Infobox references

Cinnamyl acetate (3-phenylprop-2-enyl acetate) is a chemical compound of the cinnamyl ester family, in which the variable R group is substituted by a methyl group. As a result of the non-aromatic carbon-carbon double bond, cinnamyl acetate can exist in a Z and an E configuration:

Cinnamyl ester.

(E) and (Z) isomers of cinnamyl acetate.

Cinnamyl acetate naturally occurs in fresh bark of cinnamon (Cinnamomum zeylanicum Blume and other Cinnamomum species), with concentrations of 2,800–51,000 ppm.

Cinnamyl acetate is used as a flavor ester in for example bread and animal feed and has a sweet floral-fruity fragrance. Moreover, it is used in several cosmetics, some toiletries but also in non-cosmetic products such as detergents.

== Legislation and control ==
Cinnamyl acetate, used in fragrances and as flavor ingredient, has been discussed by several institutions. In 1965, the compound was designated as generally recognized as safe as a flavor ingredient by the Flavor and Extract Manufacturers Association (FEMA). The association determined the average maximum use levels in several products that were considered to be safe:

Beverages	Ice cream, ices, etc.	Candy	Baked goods	Chewing gum
2.7 ppm	6.5 ppm	16 ppm	11 ppm	8.7 ppm

The European Parliament registered cinnamyl acetate as both a flavoring substance and a cosmetic compound in 1996. The Joint FAO/WHO Expert Committee on Food Additives (JECFA) described in 2000 that “the substance does not present a safety concern at current levels of intake when used as a flavouring agent”. In 2009, the EFSA Panel on Food Contact Materials, Enzyme, Flavourings and Processing Aids (CEF) concluded that cinnamyl acetate does not give rise to safety concerns when used as flavor ingredient in food. Cinnamyl acetate is also permitted by the U.S. Food & Drug administration for use as flavoring agent in food if the minimum quantity needed for its effect is used.

== Production and intake ==
Estimates of the average annual production and daily intake of cinnamyl acetate as flavoring agent are reported by the WHO. According to this report, the annual volume of production in Europe is 1498 kg, and in the USA 2255 kg. The daily intake per person in Europe is estimated to be 210 μg, and in the USA 300 μg. Per kg body weight the daily intake is estimated for Europeans to be 4 μg/kg and for Americans to be 5 μg/kg.

== Synthesis ==
Since cinnamyl acetate is naturally occurring in plants, it can be extracted and purified to obtain the compound. However, this has a low yield and therefore the production costs are high. The use of chemical methods can offer more efficient strategies to produce cinnamyl acetate.

There are multiple ways to synthesize cinnamyl acetate 2. One way is the synthesis from cinnamyl alcohol 1 and vinyl acetate. This reaction is catalyzed by the enzyme triacylglycerol ester hydrolase, which is a lipase that is very specific towards the ester bond. The byproduct of this reaction is acetaldehyde. The reaction equation for this reaction is:

Since acetaldehyde has an unfavorable deactivating effect on the lipase used in the synthesis, ethyl acetate can be used as reactant instead of vinyl acetate. In this transesterification reaction cinnamyl alcohol 1 reacts with ethyl acetate to form cinnamyl acetate 2 and ethanol. This synthesis requires the lipase Novozym 435, and is performed in a solvent-free system. The reaction is as follows:

Cinnamyl acetate 2 can also be synthesized via a non-enzymatic reaction. An example of such a reaction is one with the use of cinnamyl bromide 3 and sodium acetate as reactants. Since these compounds are immiscible substrates, solid-liquid phase transfer catalysis (PTC) can be used, using quaternary ammonium bromide as a phase transfer catalyst. This is shown in the following reaction:

Besides these three examples, there are many more ways to synthesize cinnamyl acetate.

The addition reaction of dinitrogen trioxide to cinnamyl acetate produces an intermediate in the synthesis of chloramphenicol.

== Metabolism ==
Cinnamyl acetate belongs to the group of cinnamyl derivatives. In general, these cinnamyl derivatives are absorbed from the gut very quickly, after which they are metabolized and excreted as polar metabolites in the urine or feces within 24 hours.

Within the cinnamyl derivatives, cinnamyl acetate belongs to the group of cinnamyl esters. After absorption from the gut, this group of compounds is first hydrolyzed to cinnamyl alcohol by carboxylesterases. Carboxylesterases are a group of enzymes. The most important enzymes within this group are the A-esterases. These are present in most body tissues, but they are prevalent in the hepatocytes. Subsequently, the cinnamyl alcohol is oxidized which leads to the formation of cinnamaldehyde. This reaction is catalyzed by human NAD^{+}-dependent alcohol dehydrogenase. Now, there are two routes for the further biotransformation of cinnamaldehyde. The minor route of biotransformation is the S-glutathionylation. The major route, however, is the conversion of cinnamaldehyde into cinnamic acid by the enzyme aldehyde dehydrogenase. Next, the cinnamic acid is transformed into cinnamoyl CoA which is again converted to either cinnamoylglycine by N-acyl transferase or to benzoyl CoA through β-oxidation, the latter being the major route. Intermediate metabolites in the β-oxidation pathway can be converted to 3-hydroxy-3-phenylpropionic acid and acetophenone, which can be excreted via the urine. However, the conversions of these intermediate metabolites are minor routes. Finally, the benzoyl CoA is conjugated with glycine under formation of hippuric acid or it is hydrolyzed generating free benzoic acid. This can be excreted via the urine directly or after glucuronidation. Hippuric acid, which is the major metabolite, is also excreted via the urine.

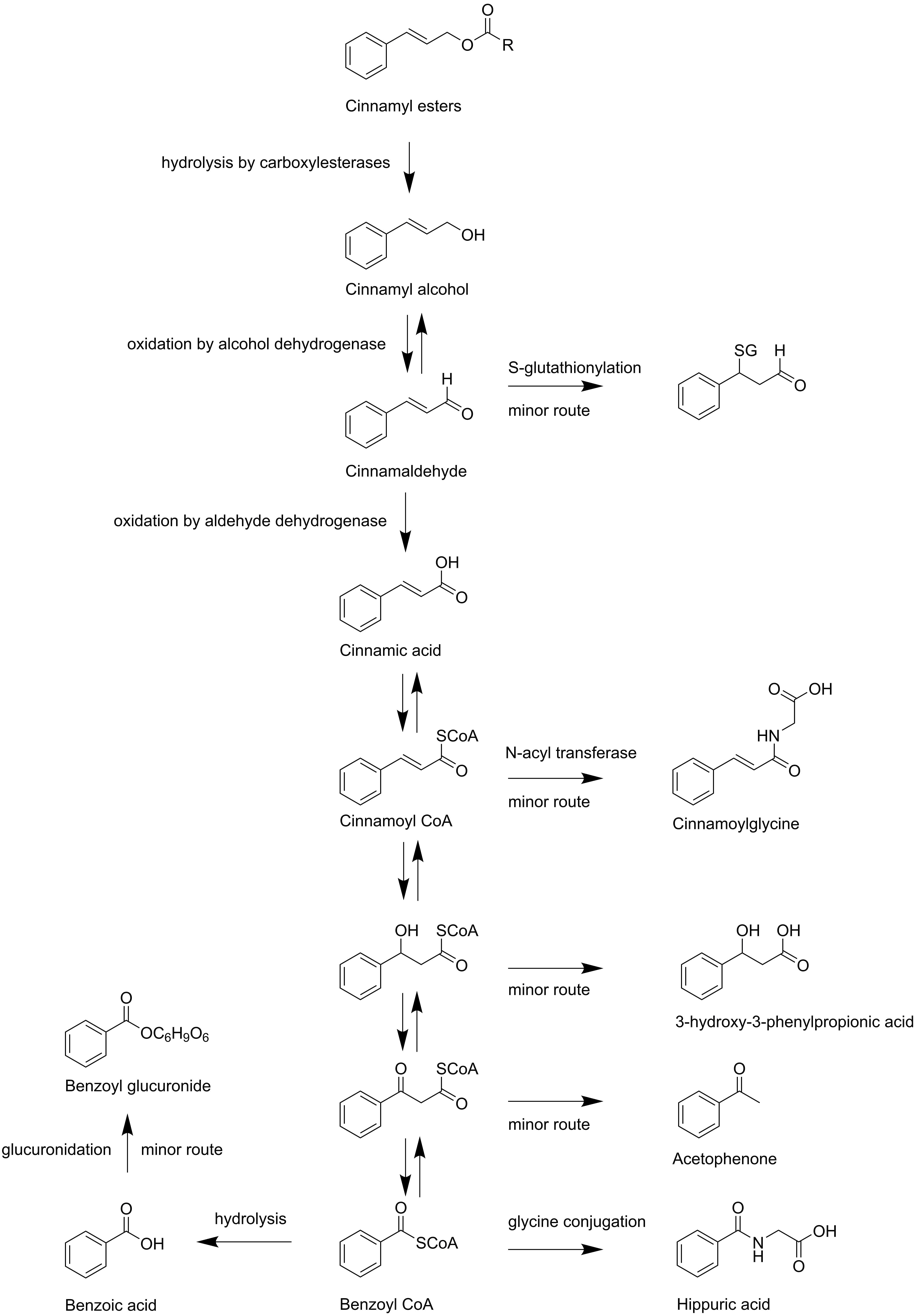
The biotransformation of cinnamyl esters.

== Toxicity ==
Since cinnamyl acetate is used as both a fragrance material and a food flavoring ingredient, dermal and oral exposure are considered to be the major routes of absorption. The dermal systematic exposure of cinnamyl acetate via cosmetic products is estimated to be 0.0115 mg/kg body weight/day.

Several experiments using animals were conducted in the past to assess the toxicity of cinnamyl acetate. In one experiment, the oral toxicity was tested in rats. The rats received oral doses of cinnamyl acetate and the LD_{50} was found to be 3.3 g/kg. During the experiment, symptoms as slow respiration and coarse tremors were observed for high doses. Other experiments showed LD_{50} values of 4.750 g/kg for oral administration in mice and guinea pigs. Also, the LD_{50} value for intraperitoneal administration was investigated and found to be 1.200 g/kg.

Furthermore, studies on the dermal toxicity were performed. Experiments on rabbits resulted in an LD_{50} of more than 5.0 g/kg, but no clinical effects were observed. Moreover, the level of skin irritation in swines was tested via a 48-h patch test. In this study, 0.05 g of cinnamyl acetate was applied and no irritation was observed. Another two experiments examined the skin irritation caused by 0.1 mL cinnamyl acetate on guinea pigs and rabbits via a direct application on the skin (open application). Mild to moderate irritation was observed in these experiments.

A no-observed-adverse-effect level (NOAEL) for oral administration of 275 mg/kg body weight/day was determined from toxicological data by the EFSA Panel on Additives and Products or Substances used in Animal Feed (FEEDAP).

Besides these experiments on animals, some human studies were executed. A 48-h closed patch test on five healthy, male volunteers was performed using 5% cinnamyl acetate in petrolatum. In this study, no irritation was observed. Mild irritation was observed in another 48-h patch test on fifty male volunteers using 32% cinnamyl acetate in acetone. Finally, a human study on skin sensitization was executed on 25 healthy, male volunteers. In this experiment a maximization test (48-h patch) was done using 5% cinnamyl acetate in petrolatum. Skin sensitization reactions were not observed.

Moreover, standard Draize tests were used to assess the dermal toxicity in humans, guinea pigs and rabbits. This resulted in mild skin irritation for doses of 16 mg per 48 hours for humans and for doses of 100 mg per 24 hours for guinea pigs. Moderate skin irritation was observed for rabbits exposed to doses of 100 mg per 24 hours.

Lastly, the potential of cinnamyl acetate to cause sister chromatid exchanges was tested using Chinese hamster ovary cells. This was done because it was found that another component of plant essence and cinnamyl derivative, cinnamaldehyde, increased the frequency of sister chromatid exchanges induced by mitomycin C. However, the result of this test proved that cinnamyl acetate does not cause sister chromatid exchange due to the absence of an alpha-beta unsaturated carbonyl group.

== Effects on animals ==
Cinnamyl acetate is found in the leaf oils of the Cinnamomum osmophloeum tree, which grows in central and northern Taiwan. It is found that these oils have antibacterial, antimildew, antitermite, antimite, antifungal and anti-inflammatory activities. Furthermore, the oils show mosquito larvicidal activity against Aedes aegypti and Aedes albopictus larvae. However, cinnamyl acetate serves only a minor role in these activities.

Moreover, cinnamyl acetate has a repellent effect on the mosquito Anopheles gambiae, and is therefore useful to protect against these insects.
