= Allyl phenylacetate =

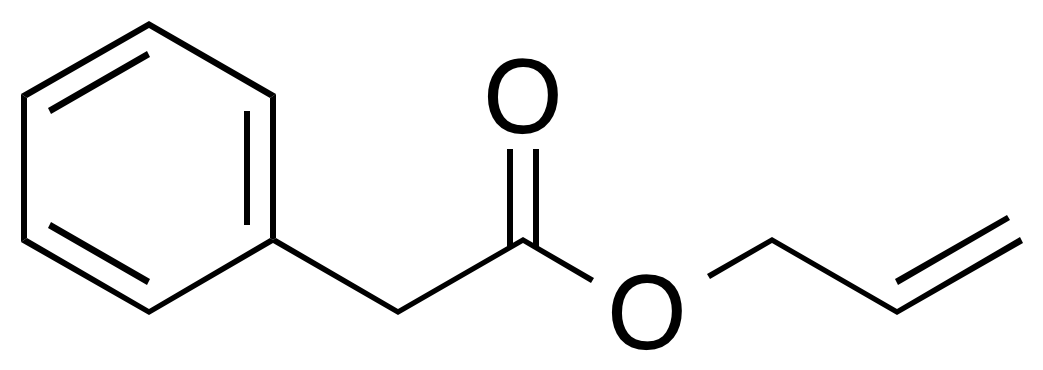

Names
- Preferred IUPAC name Prop-2-en-1-yl phenylacetate

Identifiers
CAS Number	1797-74-6
3D model (JSmol)	Interactive image
ChemSpider	14946
ECHA InfoCard	100.015.711
EC Number	217-281-2
PubChem CID	15717
UNII	3D2NBC7K7Q
CompTox Dashboard (EPA)	DTXSID8061977
- InChI: InChI=1S/C11H12O2/c1-2-8-13-11(12)9-10-6-4-3-5-7-10/h2-7H,1,8-9H2 Key: ZCDYAMJXVAUTIM-UHFFFAOYSA-N
- SMILES: C=CCOC(=O)CC1=CC=CC=C1

Properties
Chemical formula	C_{11}H_{12}O_{2}
Molar mass	176.21

Hazards
- GHS labelling
Pictograms	(GHS06: Toxic) (GHS07: Exclamation mark)
Signal word	Danger
Hazard statements	H302, H311, H315, H317, H319
Precautionary statements	P261, P264, P270, P272, P280, P301+P312, P302+P352, P305+P351+P338, P312, P321, P322, P330, P332+P313, P333+P313, P337+P313, P361, P362, P363, P405, P501
- Except where otherwise noted, data are given for materials in their standard state (at 25 °C [77 °F], 100 kPa). Infobox references

Allyl phenylacetate is an ester with a fruity honey odor, used in the perfume and flavoring industries. It is the ester resulting from the esterification of allyl alcohol and phenylacetic acid. It has not been reported to be found in nature.

Allyl phenylacetate is one of only a few known ligands for the human olfactory receptor OR51L1.
