= 2,2-Di-2-furylpropane =

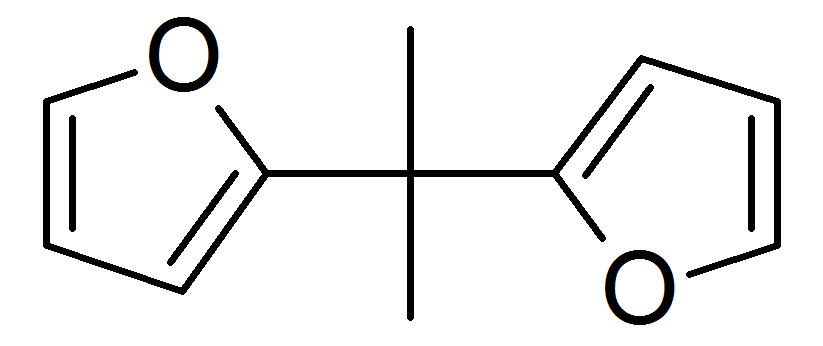

Names
- Preferred IUPAC name 2,2′-(Propane-2,2-diyl)difuran

Identifiers
CAS Number	17920-88-6
3D model (JSmol)	Interactive image
ChemSpider	517526
PubChem CID	595339
UNII	W5XD66N8BT
CompTox Dashboard (EPA)	DTXSID9073416
- InChI: InChI=1S/C11H12O2/c1-11(2,9-5-3-7-12-9)10-6-4-8-13-10/h3-8H,1-2H3 Key: OFBSTYYRPIFDPM-UHFFFAOYSA-N; InChI=1/C11H12O2/c1-11(2,9-5-3-7-12-9)10-6-4-8-13-10/h3-8H,1-2H3 Key: OFBSTYYRPIFDPM-UHFFFAOYAD
- SMILES: o1c(ccc1)C(c2occc2)(C)C

Properties
Chemical formula	C_{11}H_{12}O_{2}
Molar mass	176.215 g·mol^{−1}
- Except where otherwise noted, data are given for materials in their standard state (at 25 °C [77 °F], 100 kPa). verify (what is ?) Infobox references

2,2-Di-2-furylpropane is a condensation product of furan and acetone. It is a relatively high boiling liquid (boiling point: 85−90 °C at 13 torr) and is a precursor (via hydrogenation) to the rubber additive bis(tetrahydrofuryl)propane used in the manufacture of high vinyl content rubber for high performance tires.

== Synthesis ==
Furan and ketones react under the action of acidic catalysts yielding difuryl condensation products, higher oligomers, as well as cyclic furan tetramers (tetraoxaquterenes). If the number of furan moieties in the oligomer is denoted as n, the number of isopropylidene moieties (derived from acetone) is n-1. In the case of aldehydes only linear oligomers are formed. The simplest adduct of furan and acetone is 2,2-di-2-furylpropane, the title compound.

This molecule is typically synthesized employing two equivalents of furan and one equivalent of acetone employing concentrated hydrochloric acid as the catalyst at ambient temperature and pressure. Alternatively, the reaction may be cooled during the addition of reagents and in the early phases.

Inasmuch as the two furan moieties in 2,2-di-2-furylpropane may further react, at their respective unsubstituted 5-positions, with additional acetone the formation of oligomers can not be completely suppressed. However, the amount of oligomer is effected by reaction conditions, including the furan to acetone ratio and the amount of hydrochloric acid catalyst employed.

== Purification ==
2,2-Di-2-furylpropane may be obtained from crude aqueous acidic reaction mixtures (typically biphasic) by allowing phase separation followed by neutralization of the organic layer. Essentially pure product is obtained by vacuum distillation of the neutralized organic phase.
