= Chromosome 17 =

Human chromosome

- Human chromosome 17 pair after G-banding. One is from mother, one is from father.

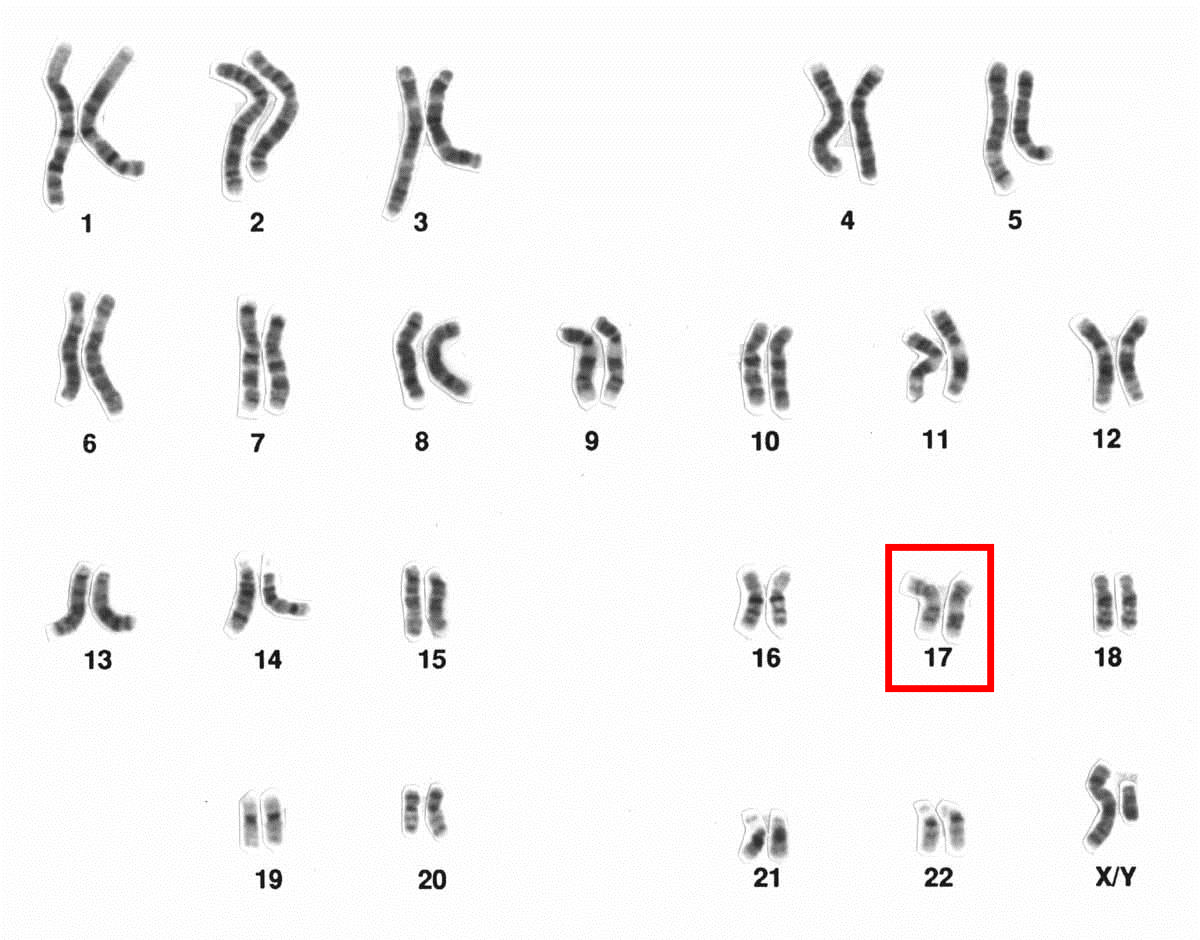
- Chromosome 17 pair in human male karyogram.

Features
- Length (bp): 84,276,897 bp (CHM13)
- No. of genes: 1,124 (CCDS)
- Type: Autosome
- Centromere position: Submetacentric (25.1 Mbp)

Complete gene lists
- CCDS: Gene list
- HGNC: Gene list
- UniProt: Gene list
- NCBI: Gene list

External map viewers
- Ensembl: Chromosome 17
- Entrez: Chromosome 17
- NCBI: Chromosome 17
- UCSC: Chromosome 17

Full DNA sequences
- RefSeq: NC_000017 (FASTA)
- GenBank: CM000679 (FASTA)

Chromosome 17 is one of the 23 pairs of chromosomes in humans. People normally have two copies of this chromosome. Chromosome 17 spans more than 84 million base pairs (the building material of DNA) and represents between 2.5 and 3% of the total DNA in cells.

Chromosome 17 contains the Homeobox B gene cluster.

== Genes ==
=== Number of genes ===
The following are some of the gene count estimates of human chromosome 17. Because researchers use different approaches to genome annotation their predictions of the number of genes on each chromosome varies (for technical details, see gene prediction). The most conservative estimate, from CCDS, represents a lower bound on the total number of human protein-coding genes.

Estimated by	Protein-coding genes	Non-coding RNA genes	Pseudogenes	Source	Release date
CCDS	1,124	—	—		2016-09-08
HGNC	1,137	404	495		2024-10-04
Ensembl	1,184	1,199	535		2017-03-29
UniProt	1,174	—	—		2024-10-02
NCBI	1,199	757	566		2017-05-19

=== Gene list ===
The following is a partial list of genes on human chromosome 17. For complete list, see the link in the infobox on the right.

- ABI3: encoding protein ABI gene family member 3
- ABR: encoding protein Abr, rhogef and gtpase activating protein
- ARHGAP44: encoding protein Rho GTPase activating protein 44
- AZI1: encoding protein 5-azacytidine-induced protein 1
- BRCA1P1: BRCA1 pseudogene 1
- C17orf67: encoding protein Chromosome 17 open reading frame 67
- C1QL1: encoding protein complement component 1, q subcomponent-like 1
- CCDC144A: encoding protein Coiled-coil domain-containing protein 144A
- CCDC40: encoding protein Coiled-coil domain containing 40
- CCDC47: encoding protein PAT complex subunit CCDC47
- CCDC57: encoding protein Coiled-coil domain-containing protein 57
- CCL3L3: encoding protein C-C motif chemokine ligand 3 like 3
- CLUH: encoding protein Clustered mitochondria (cluA/CLU1) homolog
- CTAA2: encoding protein Cataract, anterior polar 2
- CTDNEP1: encoding protein CTD nuclear envelope phosphatase 1
- CUEDC1: encoding protein Cue domain containing 1
- DHX8: encoding protein DEAH-box helicase 8
- DPH1 encoding protein Diphthamide biosynthesis protein 1
- DRC3 encoding protein Dynein regulatory complex subunit 3
- FAM106A: encoding protein Family with sequence similarity 106 member A
- FAM20A: encoding protein FAM20A
- GAS7: encoding protein Growth arrest-specific protein 7
- GGT6: encoding protein Gamma-glutamyltransferase 6
- HIGD1B: encoding protein HIG1 hypoxia inducible domain family member 1B
- INCA1: encoding protein Inhibitor of cdk, cyclin a1 interacting protein 1
- JPT1: encoding protein Jupiter microtubule associated homolog 1
- KRTAP locus: encoding ca. 40 Keratin-associated proteins
- LINC00511: producing Long intergenic non-protein coding RNA 511
- LINC00674: producing Long intergenic non-protein coding RNA 674
- LINC00483: encoding protein Long intergenic non-protein coding rna 483
- LRRC37A encoding protein Leucine rich repeat containing 37A
- MAPT-AS1: encoding noncoding RNA MAPT antisense RNA 1
- MBTD1: encoding protein Malignant Brain Tumor domain containing 1
- METTL16: encoding protein Methyltransferase like 16
- MGAT5B: encoding enzyme Alpha-1,6-mannosylglycoprotein 6-beta-N-acetylglucosaminyltransferase B
- MIR1250: encoding protein MicroRNA 1250
- MIR195: producing MicroRNA 195
- MIR4521: producing MicroRNA 4521
- MIR4727: producing MicroRNA 4727
- MLLT6: encoding protein MLLT6, PHD finger containing
- MRM3: encoding enzyme rRNA methyltransferase 3, mitochondrial
- MSI2: encoding protein Musashi RNA binding protein 2
- MTRNR2L1: encoding protein Mt-rnr2-like 1
- MYBBP1A: encoding protein Myb-binding protein 1A
- MYCBPAP: encoding protein MYCBP associated protein
- NBP: encoding peptide Neuropeptide B
- NME1-NME2:
- NXPH3: encoding protein Neurexophilin-3
- OMG: encoding protein Oligodendrocyte-myelin glycoprotein
- Ormdl sphingolipid biosynthesis regulator 3: encoding protein ORMDL sphingolipid biosynthesis regulator 3
- PLXDC1: encoding protein Plexin domain-containing protein 1
- PNPO: encoding enzyme Pyridoxine-5'-phosphate oxidase
- PPP1R27: encoding protein Protein phosphatase 1, regulatory subunit 27
- PRAL: encoding protein P53 regulation associated lncRNA
- PRCD: encoding protein Progressive rod-cone degeneration
- PRPSAP2: encoding protein Phosphoribosyl pyrophosphate synthetase-associated protein 2
- PRR11: encoding protein Proline rich 11
- PRR29: encoding protein Proline-rich protein 29
- QRICH2: encoding protein Glutamine-rich protein 2
- RAP1GAP2: encoding protein RAP1 GTPase activating protein 2
- RETREG3: encoding protein Reticulophagy regulator 3
- RFFL: encoding enzyme E3 ubiquitin-protein ligase rififylin
- RPAIN: encoding protein RPA-interacting protein
- SC65: encoding protein Synaptonemal complex protein SC65
- SCIMP: encoding protein Slp adaptor and csk interacting membrane protein
- SCPEP1: encoding enzyme Retinoid-inducible serine carboxypeptidase
- SEBOX: encoding protein SEBOX homeobox
- SECTM1: encoding protein Secreted and transmembrane protein 1
- SEPTIN4: encoding Septin4
- SKA2: encoding protein Spindle and Kinetochore Associated
- SLC39A11: encoding protein Solute carrier family 39 member 11
- SLFN13 : encoding protein Schlafen family member 13
- SNF8: encoding protein Vacuolar-sorting protein SNF8
- SPACA3: Sperm acrosome membrane-associated protein 3
- SPAG5: encoding protein Sperm-associated antigen 5
- SPMAP1: encoding protein Sperm microtubule associated protein 1
- ST6GALNAC1: encoding enzyme Alpha-N-acetylgalactosaminide alpha-2,6-sialyltransferase 1
- ST6GALNAC2: encoding enzyme Alpha-N-acetylgalactosaminide alpha-2,6-sialyltransferase 2
- STH: encoding protein Saitohin
- TAC4: encoding protein Tachykinin-4
- TBC1D3: encoding protein TBC1 domain family member 3E/3F
- TMEM106A: encoding protein Transmembrane protein 106A
- TMEM94: encoding protein Transmembrane protein 94
- TMEM98: encoding protein Transmembrane protein 98
- TNFSF12-TNFSF13:
- TOM1L1: encoding protein TOM1-like protein 1
- TOM1L2: encoding protein TOM1-like protein 2
- TRIM65: encoding protein Tripartite motif containing 65
- TRPV1: encoding protein Transient receptor potential cation channel subfamily V member 1
- TSEN54: encoding protein TRNA splicing endonuclease subunit 54
- TTYH2: encoding protein Tweety family member 2
- VAT1: encoding protein Synaptic vesicle membrane protein VAT-1 homolog
- VCF1: encoding protein VCF1
- VEZF1: encoding protein Vascular endothelial zinc finger 1
- VPS25: encoding protein Vacuolar protein-sorting-associated protein 25
- VPS53: encoding protein Vacuolar protein sorting 53 homolog (S. cerevisiae)
- WFDC21P: encoding protein WAP four-disulfide core domain 21, pseudogene
- YBX2: encoding protein Y-box-binding protein 2
- ZNF207: encoding protein Zinc finger protein 207
- ZNF830: encoding protein Zinc finger protein 830

Groups of similar genes:

- 60S ribosomal proteins: RPL19, RPL23, RPL23A, RPL26, and RPL38
- ABC transporters, subfamily ABCA: ABCA5, ABCA6, ABCA8, ABCA9, ABCA10
- Arachidonate lipoxygenases: ALOX12, ALOX12B, ALOX15, ALOX15B, ALOXE3
- Amine oxidases, copper containing: AOC1, AOC2, AOC3
- Voltage-dependent calcium channel subunits: CACNA1G, CACNB1, CACNG1, CACNG4, CACNG5
- Several CC chemokines: CCL1, CCL2, CCL3, CCL4, CCL5, CCL7, CCL8, CCL11, CCL13, CCL14, CCL15, CCL16, CCL18, and CCL23
- CD300 family: CD300A, CD300C, CD300E, CD300LB, CD300LD, CD300LF, CD300LG
- DEAD box helicases: DDX2A (EIF4A1), DDX5, DDX42, DDX48 (EIF4A3), DDX52
- FOX (forkhead box) proteins: FOXJ1, FOXK2, FOXN1
- Homeobox B genes: HOXB1, HOXB2, HOXB3, HOXB4, HOXB5, HOXB6, HOXB7, HOXB8, HOXB9, HOXB13
- Integrin subunits: ITGA2B, ITGA3, ITGAE, ITGB3, ITGB4
- Potassium channel subunits: KCNAB3, KCNH4, KCNH6, KCNJ2, KCNJ12, KCNJ16, KCNJ18
- Kinesins: KIF1C, KIF2B, KIF18B, KIF19
- Type I keratins (acidic): KRT9, KRT10, KRT12, KRT13, KRT14, KRT15, KRT16, KRT17, KRT19, KRT20, KRT23, KRT24, KRT25, KRT26, KRT27, KRT28, KRT31, KRT32, KRT33A, KRT33B, KRT34, KRT35, KRT36, KRT37, KRT38, KRT39, and KRT40
- Mitogen-activated protein kinase kinases: MAP2K3, MAP2K4, MAP2K6
- Mediator complex subunits: MED1, MED9, MED11, MED13, MED24, MED31
- Myosins: MYH1, MYH2, MYH3, MYH4, MYH8, MYH10, MYH13, MYL4, MYO1C, MYO1D, MYO15A, MYO15B, MYO18A, MYO19
- Olfactory receptors: OR1A1, OR1A2, OR1D2, OR1D4, OR1D5, OR1E1, OR1E2, OR1E3, OR1G1, OR3A1, OR3A2, OR3A3, OR3A4, OR4D1, OR4D2
- Proteasome subunits: PSMB3, PSMB6, PSMC5, PSMD3, PSMD11, PSMD12, PSME3
- Rab family: RAB5C, RAB34, RAB37, RAB40B
- RING finger proteins: RNF43, RNF112, RNF135, RNF157, RNF167, RNF213, RNF222, RNF227
- Schlafen family: SLFN5, SLFN11, SLFN12, SLFN12L, SLFN13, SLFN14
- STAT proteins: STAT3, STAT5A, STAT5B
- Tubulins: TUBD1, TUBG1, TUBG2
- Ubiquitin-conjugating enzymes: UBE2G1, UBE2O, UBE2Z
- Ubiquitin-specific proteases: USP6, USP22, USP32, USP36, USP43

The following are some of the genes and their corresponding Cytogenetic location on chromosome 17:

==== p-arm ====
- FLCN: folliculin (17p11.2)
- MYO15A: myosin XVA (17p11.2)
- RAI1: retinoic acid induced 1 (17p11.2)
- PMP22: peripheral myelin protein 22 (17p12)
- CTNS: cystinosin, the lysosomal cystine transporter (17p13)
- USP6: Ubiquitin carboxyl-terminal hydrolase 6 linked to Aneurysmal bone cyst (17p13)
- ACADVL: acyl-coenzyme A dehydrogenase, very long chain (17p13.1)
- SHBG: Sex hormone binding globulin (17p13.1)
- TP53: tumor suppressor protein p53 (Li-Fraumeni syndrome), tumor suppressor gene (17p13.1)
- ASPA: aspartoacylase (Canavan disease) (17p13.3)
- GLOD4: glyoxalase domain containing 4 (17p13.3)

==== q-arm ====
- NSRP1: Coiled-coil domain-containing protein 55 (17q11.2)
- FLOT2: flotillin 2 (17q11.2)
- NF1: neurofibromin 1 (neurofibromatosis, von Recklinghausen disease, Watson disease) (17q11.2)
- SLC6A4: Serotonin transporter linked to Obsessive Compulsive Disorder (OCD) (17q11.2)
- CCL4L1: C-C motif chemokine ligand 4 like 1 (17q12)
- DDX52: DExD-box helicase 52 (17q12)
- ERBB2 loca leukemia viral oncogene homolog 2, neuro/glioblastoma derived oncogene homolog (avian) (17q12)
- GRB7: Growth factor Receptor-Bound protein 7 (17q12)
- BRCA1: breast cancer 1, early onset (17q21)
- GFAP: glial fibrillary acidic protein (17q21)
- RARA or RAR-alpha: Retinoic acid receptor Alpha (involved in t(15,17) with PML) (17q21)
- Type I keratin cluster (17q21.2)
- NAGLU: N-acetyl glucosaminidase, Sanfilippo B syndrome (17q21.2)
- SLC4A1: Band 3 anion transporter protein. Solute carrier family 4, member 1 (17q21.31)
- MAPT gene coding for encoding tau protein (17q21.31)
- CBX1: chromobox homolog 1 (17q21.32)
- HOXB cluster (17q21.32)
- COL1A1: collagen, type I, alpha 1 (17q21.33)
- LUC7L3: LUC7 like 3 pre-mRNA splicing factor (17q21.33)
- NOG: Noggin protein (17q22)
- RPS6KB1 or S6K: Ribosomal protein S6-kinase (17q23.1)
- FTSJ3: FtsJ homolog 3 (17q23.3)
- SCN4A: Voltage-Gated Sodium Channel Subunit Alpha Nav1.4 (17q23.3)
- GALK1: galactokinase 1 (17q24)
- KCNJ2: potassium inwardly-rectifying channel, subfamily J, member 2 (17q24.3)
- ACTG1: actin, gamma 1 (17q25)
- CDC42EP4: CDC42 effector protein 4 (17q25.1)
- USH1G: Usher syndrome 1G (autosomal recessive) (17q25.1)
- CANT1: Calcium-activated nucleotidase 1 (17q25.3)
- BIRC5: Survivin (17q25.3)
- CHMP6: Charged multivesicular body protein 6 (17q25.3)
- ENPP7: ectonucleotide pyrophosphatase/phosphodiesterase 7 (17q25.3)
- RHBDF2: Rhomboid family member 2 (17q25.3)
- TMC6 and TMC8: Transmembrane channel-like 6 and 8 (epidermodysplasia verruciformis) (17q25.3)

== Diseases and disorders ==
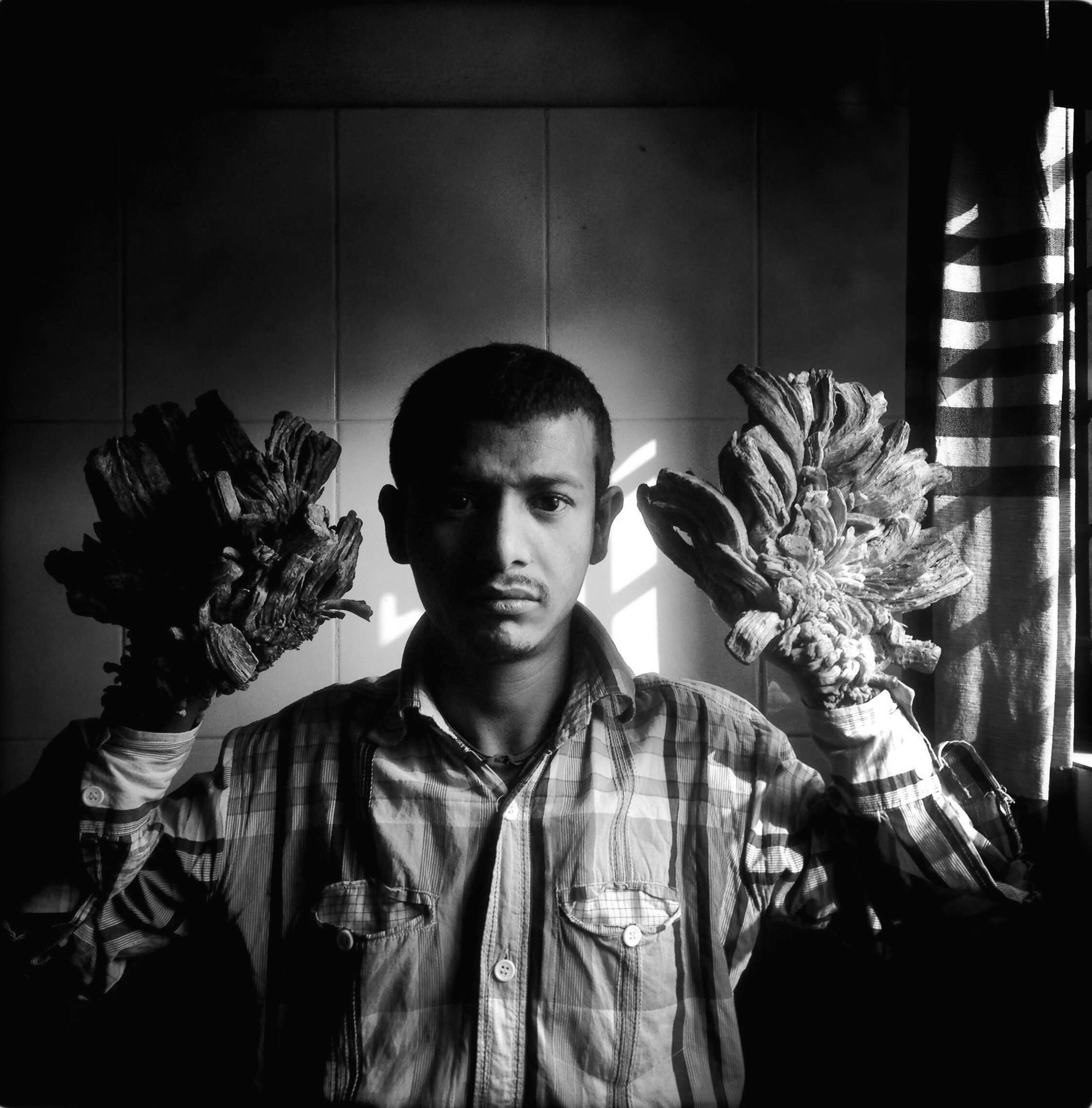
Inactivating PH mutation in either the EVER1 or EVER2 genes, which are located adjacent to one another on chromosome 17 causes Epidermodysplasia verruciformis.

The following diseases are related to genes on chromosome 17:

- 17q12 microdeletion syndrome
- Koolen–de Vries syndrome
- Alexander disease
- Andersen–Tawil syndrome
- Aneurysmal bone cyst
- Bipolar disorder
- Birt–Hogg–Dubé syndrome
- Bladder cancer
- Breast cancer
- Bruck syndrome
- Campomelic dysplasia
- Canavan disease
- Cerebroretinal microangiopathy with calcifications and cysts
- Charcot–Marie–Tooth disease
- Chronic lymphocytic leukaemia, tp53
- Corticobasal degeneration
- Cystinosis
- Depression
- Ehlers–Danlos syndrome
- Epidermodysplasia verruciformis
- Frontotemporal dementia and parkinsonism linked to chromosome 17
- Galactosemia
- Glycogen storage disease type II (Pompe disease)
- Hereditary neuropathy with liability to pressure palsies
- Howel–Evans syndrome
- Li–Fraumeni syndrome
- Maturity onset diabetes of the young type 5
- Miller–Dieker syndrome
- Multiple synostoses syndrome
- Neurofibromatosis type I
- Nonsyndromic deafness
- Obsessive–compulsive disorder
- Osteogenesis imperfecta
- Potocki–Lupski syndrome
- Proximal symphalangism
- Sanfilippo syndrome
- Smith–Magenis syndrome
- Usher syndrome
- Very long-chain acyl-coenzyme A dehydrogenase deficiency
- Von Gierke's syndrome

== Cytogenetic band ==
G-banding ideograms of human chromosome 17

G-banding ideogram of human chromosome 17 in resolution 850 bphs. Band length in this diagram is proportional to base-pair length. This type of ideogram is generally used in genome browsers (e.g. Ensembl, UCSC Genome Browser).

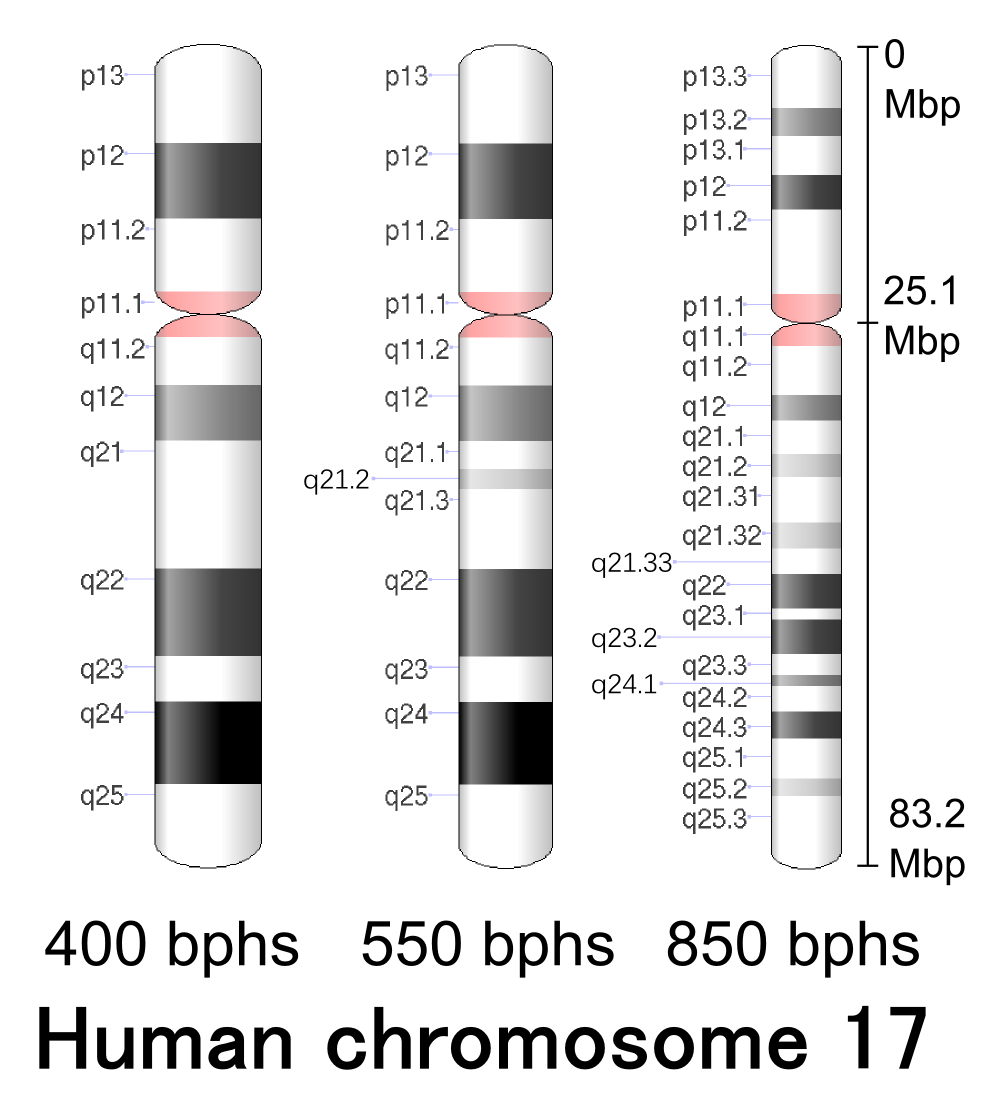
G-banding patterns of human chromosome 17 in three different resolutions (400, 550 and 850). Band length in this diagram is based on the ideograms from ISCN (2013). This type of ideogram represents actual relative band length observed under a microscope at the different moments during the mitotic process.

G-bands of human chromosome 17 in resolution 850 bphs
Chr.	Arm	Band	ISCN start	ISCN stop	Basepair start	Basepair stop	Stain	Density
17	p	13.3	0	385	1	3,400,000	gneg	
17	p	13.2	385	550	3,400,001	6,500,000	gpos	50
17	p	13.1	550	784	6,500,001	10,800,000	gneg	
17	p	12	784	990	10,800,001	16,100,000	gpos	75
17	p	11.2	990	1499	16,100,001	22,700,000	gneg	
17	p	11.1	1499	1664	22,700,001	25,100,000	acen	
17	q	11.1	1664	1815	25,100,001	27,400,000	acen	
17	q	11.2	1815	2104	27,400,001	33,500,000	gneg	
17	q	12	2104	2255	33,500,001	39,800,000	gpos	50
17	q	21.1	2255	2461	39,800,001	40,200,000	gneg	
17	q	21.2	2461	2599	40,200,001	42,800,000	gpos	25
17	q	21.31	2599	2874	42,800,001	46,800,000	gneg	
17	q	21.32	2874	3025	46,800,001	49,300,000	gpos	25
17	q	21.33	3025	3176	49,300,001	52,100,000	gneg	
17	q	22	3176	3383	52,100,001	59,500,000	gpos	75
17	q	23.1	3383	3451	59,500,001	60,200,000	gneg	
17	q	23.2	3451	3658	60,200,001	63,100,000	gpos	75
17	q	23.3	3658	3781	63,100,001	64,600,000	gneg	
17	q	24.1	3781	3850	64,600,001	66,200,000	gpos	50
17	q	24.2	3850	4001	66,200,001	69,100,000	gneg	
17	q	24.3	4001	4166	69,100,001	72,900,000	gpos	75
17	q	25.1	4166	4400	72,900,001	76,800,000	gneg	
17	q	25.2	4400	4510	76,800,001	77,200,000	gpos	25
17	q	25.3	4510	4950	77,200,001	83,257,441	gneg	
