= Inhibitor of CDK, cyclin A1 interacting protein 1 =

Protein-coding gene in the species Homo sapiens

INCA1

Identifiers
- Aliases: INCA1, HSD45, inhibitor of CDK, cyclin A1 interacting protein 1
- External IDs: OMIM: 617374; MGI: 2144284; HomoloGene: 19481; GeneCards: INCA1; OMA:INCA1 - orthologs

Gene location (Human)
Chr.	Chromosome 17 (human)
Band	17p13.2	Start	4,988,130 bp
Band	17p13.2	End	4,997,610 bp

Gene location (Mouse)
Chr.	Chromosome 11 (mouse)
Band	11|11 B3	Start	70,579,187 bp
Band	11|11 B3	End	70,590,981 bp
RNA expression pattern
Bgee	Human / Mouse (ortholog); Top expressed in: right testis; left testis; gonad; testicle; apex of heart; gastrocnemius muscle; muscle of thigh; duodenum; right lobe of thyroid gland; mucosa of transverse colon / Top expressed in: left lobe of liver; saccule; brown adipose tissue; otic vesicle; seminiferous tubule; tunica adventitia of aorta; muscle of thigh; soleus muscle; spermatocyte; embryo; More reference expression data
BioGPS	n/a
Gene ontology
Molecular function	cyclin-dependent protein serine/threonine kinase inhibitor activity; protein binding; cyclin binding; protein-containing complex binding; protein kinase inhibitor activity
Cellular component	cytoplasm; nucleoplasm; nuclear body; nucleus
Biological process	positive regulation of apoptotic signaling pathway; negative regulation of cyclin-dependent protein serine/threonine kinase activity; negative regulation of cell population proliferation
Sources:Amigo / QuickGO
Orthologs
Species	Human	Mouse
Entrez	388324	103844
Ensembl	ENSG00000196388	ENSMUSG00000057054
UniProt	Q0VD86	Q6PKN7
RefSeq (mRNA)	NM_001167985; NM_001167986; NM_001167987; NM_213726; NM_001394788 NM_001394789; NM_001394790; NM_001394791	NM_001252482; NM_001252483; NM_001252484; NM_001252485; NM_213729
RefSeq (protein)	NP_001161457; NP_001161458; NP_001161459; NP_998891	NP_001239411; NP_001239412; NP_001239413; NP_001239414; NP_998894
Location (UCSC)	Chr 17: 4.99 – 5 Mb	Chr 11: 70.58 – 70.59 Mb
PubMed search
- Wikidata
View/Edit Human	View/Edit Mouse

Inhibitor of CDK, cyclin A1 interacting protein 1 is a protein that in humans is encoded by the INCA1 gene.
