= SLFN12L =

Protein-coding gene in the species Homo sapiens

Identifiers
- Aliases: SLFN12L, schlafen family member 12 like
- External IDs: OMIM: 614956; MGI: 1329005; HomoloGene: 133236; GeneCards: SLFN12L; OMA:SLFN12L - orthologs

Gene location (Human)
Chr.	Chromosome 17 (human)
Band	17q12	Start	35,464,249 bp
Band	17q12	End	35,537,678 bp

Gene location (Mouse)
Chr.	Chromosome 11 (mouse)
Band	11|11 C	Start	83,082,156 bp
Band	11|11 C	End	83,105,980 bp
RNA expression pattern
Bgee	Human / Mouse (ortholog); Top expressed in: granulocyte; blood; spleen; testicle; lymph node; appendix; bone marrow cell; tonsil; duodenum; gallbladder / Top expressed in: thymus; bone marrow; granulocyte; neck; uterus; pharynx; quadriceps femoris muscle; spermatid; tongue; circulatory system; More reference expression data
BioGPS	n/a
Orthologs
Species	Human	Mouse
Entrez	100506736	20557
Ensembl	ENSG00000205045	ENSMUSG00000018986
UniProt	Q6IEE8	n/a
RefSeq (mRNA)	NM_001145027; NM_001195790; NM_001363830	NM_011409
RefSeq (protein)	NP_001182719; NP_001350759	n/a
Location (UCSC)	Chr 17: 35.46 – 35.54 Mb	Chr 11: 83.08 – 83.11 Mb
PubMed search
- Wikidata
View/Edit Human	View/Edit Mouse

Schlafen family member 12 like is a protein that in humans is encoded by the SLFN12L gene.
