= MYBBP1A =

Protein-coding gene in the species Homo sapiens

Identifiers
- Aliases: MYBBP1A, P160, PAP2, MYB binding protein 1a, Pol5
- External IDs: OMIM: 604885; MGI: 106181; GeneCards: MYBBP1A

Gene location (Human)
Chr.	Chromosome 17 (human)
Band	17p13.2	Start	4,538,897 bp
Band	17p13.2	End	4,555,386 bp

Gene location (Mouse)
Chr.	Chromosome 11 (mouse)
Band	11 B4|11 44.29 cM	Start	72,332,181 bp
Band	11 B4|11 44.29 cM	End	72,342,594 bp
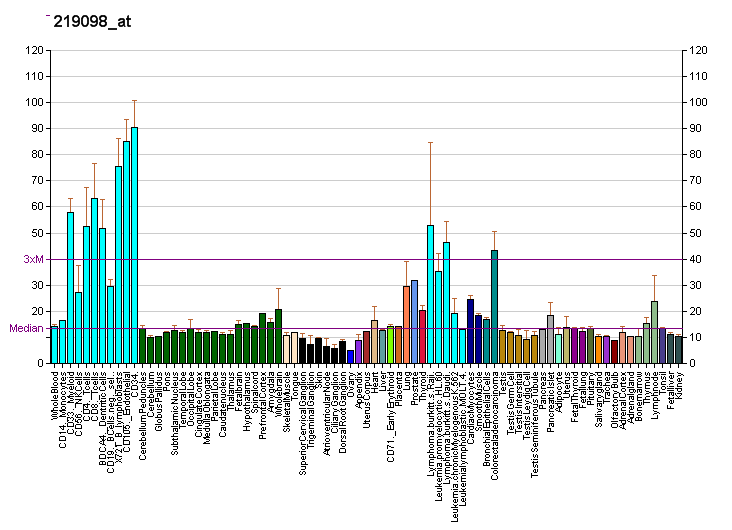
RNA expression pattern
Bgee	Human / Mouse (ortholog); Top expressed in: sural nerve; buccal mucosa cell; right frontal lobe; right hemisphere of cerebellum; right uterine tube; body of pancreas; skin of abdomen; gastrocnemius muscle; skin of leg; apex of heart / Top expressed in: tail of embryo; genital tubercle; Paneth cell; internal carotid artery; ventricular zone; condyle; otic placode; somite; primitive streak; morula; More reference expression data
BioGPS	More reference expression data
Gene ontology
Molecular function	sequence-specific DNA binding; DNA binding; transcription corepressor activity; transcription factor binding; protein binding; DNA-directed DNA polymerase activity; RNA binding; E-box binding
Cellular component	cytoplasm; intracellular membrane-bounded organelle; membrane; nucleoplasm; NLS-dependent protein nuclear import complex; nucleolus; nucleus
Biological process	epigenetic maintenance of chromatin in transcription-competent conformation; cellular response to glucose starvation; DNA biosynthetic process; regulation of transcription, DNA-templated; rhythmic process; circadian regulation of gene expression; transcription, DNA-templated; nucleocytoplasmic transport; osteoblast differentiation; intrinsic apoptotic signaling pathway by p53 class mediator; positive regulation of anoikis; respiratory electron transport chain; negative regulation of transcription, DNA-templated; ribosome biogenesis
Sources:Amigo / QuickGO
Orthologs
Databases	NCBI: entry; OMA: entry
Species	Human	Mouse
Entrez	10514	18432
Ensembl	ENSG00000132382	ENSMUSG00000040463
UniProt	Q9BQG0	Q7TPV4
RefSeq (mRNA)	NM_001105538; NM_014520	NM_016776
RefSeq (protein)	NP_001099008; NP_055335	NP_058056
Location (UCSC)	Chr 17: 4.54 – 4.56 Mb	Chr 11: 72.33 – 72.34 Mb
PubMed search
- Wikidata
View/Edit Human	View/Edit Mouse

Myb-binding protein 1A is a protein that in humans is encoded by the MYBBP1A gene.
