= OR4D1 =

Protein-coding gene in the species Homo sapiens

Identifiers
- Aliases: OR4D1, OR17-23, OR4D3, OR4D4P, TPCR16, olfactory receptor family 4 subfamily D member 1
- External IDs: MGI: 3030298; GeneCards: OR4D1

Gene location (Human)
Chr.	Chromosome 17 (human)
Band	17q22	Start	58,148,384 bp
Band	17q22	End	58,159,585 bp

Gene location (Mouse)
Chr.	Chromosome 11 (mouse)
Band	11|11 C	Start	87,804,094 bp
Band	11|11 C	End	87,811,793 bp
RNA expression pattern
Bgee	Human / Mouse (ortholog); Top expressed in: granulocyte; lymph node; blood; cecum; pharynx; appendix; spleen; tonsil / Top expressed in: embryo; secondary oocyte; hypothalamus; primary visual cortex; superior frontal gyrus; More reference expression data
BioGPS	n/a
Gene ontology
Molecular function	G protein-coupled receptor activity; transmembrane signaling receptor activity; signal transducer activity; olfactory receptor activity
Cellular component	membrane; plasma membrane; integral component of membrane
Biological process	detection of chemical stimulus involved in sensory perception; signal transduction; response to stimulus; detection of chemical stimulus involved in sensory perception of smell; sensory perception of smell; G protein-coupled receptor signaling pathway
Sources:Amigo / QuickGO
Orthologs
Databases	NCBI: entry; OMA: entry
Species	Human	Mouse
Entrez	26689	258407
Ensembl	ENSG00000141194	ENSMUSG00000060787
UniProt	Q15615	Q5SW48
RefSeq (mRNA)	NM_012374; NM_001386095	NM_146412
RefSeq (protein)	NP_036506	NP_666524
Location (UCSC)	Chr 17: 58.15 – 58.16 Mb	Chr 11: 87.8 – 87.81 Mb
PubMed search
- Wikidata
View/Edit Human	View/Edit Mouse

Olfactory receptor 4D1 is a protein that in humans is encoded by the OR4D1 gene.

Olfactory receptors interact with odorant molecules in the nose, to initiate a neuronal response that triggers the perception of a smell. The olfactory receptor proteins are members of a large family of G-protein-coupled receptors (GPCR) arising from single coding-exon genes. Olfactory receptors share a 7-transmembrane domain structure with many neurotransmitter and hormone receptors and are responsible for the recognition and G protein-mediated transduction of odorant signals. The olfactory receptor gene family is the largest in the genome. The nomenclature assigned to the olfactory receptor genes and proteins for this organism is independent of other organisms.

== See also ==
- Olfactory receptor
