= OR1E2 =

Protein-coding gene in the species Homo sapiens

Identifiers
- Aliases: OR1E2, OR17-135, OR17-93, OR1E4, OR1E7, OST529, OR17-136, olfactory receptor family 1 subfamily E member 2
- External IDs: MGI: 109315; GeneCards: OR1E2

Gene location (Human)
Chr.	Chromosome 17 (human)
Band	17p13.2	Start	3,432,870 bp
Band	17p13.2	End	3,433,841 bp

Gene location (Mouse)
Chr.	Chromosome 11 (mouse)
Band	11|11 B4	Start	73,241,609 bp
Band	11|11 B4	End	73,246,777 bp
RNA expression pattern
Bgee	Human / Mouse (ortholog); Top expressed in: muscle of thigh; superior frontal gyrus; lymph node / Top expressed in: spermatocyte; More reference expression data
BioGPS	n/a
Gene ontology
Molecular function	G protein-coupled receptor activity; olfactory receptor activity; transmembrane signaling receptor activity; signal transducer activity; signaling receptor activity
Cellular component	integral component of membrane; plasma membrane; integral component of plasma membrane; membrane
Biological process	sensory perception of chemical stimulus; sensory perception of smell; detection of chemical stimulus involved in sensory perception of smell; detection of chemical stimulus involved in sensory perception; signal transduction; response to stimulus; G protein-coupled receptor signaling pathway
Sources:Amigo / QuickGO
Orthologs
Databases	NCBI: entry; OMA: entry
Species	Human	Mouse
Entrez	8388	258925
Ensembl	ENSG00000127780	ENSMUSG00000062128
UniProt	P47887	Q7TRX9
RefSeq (mRNA)	NM_003554	NM_146923
RefSeq (protein)	NP_003545	NP_667134
Location (UCSC)	Chr 17: 3.43 – 3.43 Mb	Chr 11: 73.24 – 73.25 Mb
PubMed search
- Wikidata
View/Edit Human	View/Edit Mouse

Olfactory receptor 1E2 is a protein that in humans is encoded by the OR1E2 gene.

Olfactory receptors interact with odorant molecules in the nose, to initiate a neuronal response that triggers the perception of a smell. The olfactory receptor proteins are members of a large family of G-protein-coupled receptors (GPCR) arising from single coding-exon genes. Olfactory receptors share a 7-transmembrane domain structure with many neurotransmitter and hormone receptors and are responsible for the recognition and G protein-mediated transduction of odorant signals. The olfactory receptor gene family is the largest in the genome. The nomenclature assigned to the olfactory receptor genes and proteins for this organism is independent of other organisms.

== See also ==
- Olfactory receptor
