= TUBD1 =

Protein-coding gene in the species Homo sapiens

Identifiers
- Aliases: TUBD1, TUBD, tubulin delta 1
- External IDs: OMIM: 607344; MGI: 1891826; GeneCards: TUBD1

Gene location (Human)
Chr.	Chromosome 17 (human)
Band	17q23.1	Start	59,859,479 bp
Band	17q23.1	End	59,892,945 bp

Gene location (Mouse)
Chr.	Chromosome 11 (mouse)
Band	11|11 C	Start	86,435,817 bp
Band	11|11 C	End	86,458,186 bp
RNA expression pattern
Bgee	Human / Mouse (ortholog); Top expressed in: secondary oocyte; buccal mucosa cell; gonad; testicle; epithelium of colon; ventricular zone; body of pancreas; Achilles tendon; granulocyte; tonsil / Top expressed in: spermatocyte; spermatid; seminiferous tubule; morula; zygote; muscle of thigh; primary oocyte; sternocleidomastoid muscle; secondary oocyte; otic vesicle; More reference expression data
BioGPS	n/a
Gene ontology
Molecular function	nucleotide binding; GTP binding; structural constituent of cytoskeleton; GTPase activity
Cellular component	centriole; microtubule; cytoskeleton; nucleus; nucleoplasm; cytoplasm; cytosol; cilium; cell projection
Biological process	multicellular organism development; microtubule-based process; cytoskeleton organization; positive regulation of smoothened signaling pathway; cell projection organization; microtubule cytoskeleton organization; mitotic cell cycle
Sources:Amigo / QuickGO
Orthologs
Databases	NCBI: entry; OMA: entry
Species	Human	Mouse
Entrez	51174	56427
Ensembl	ENSG00000108423	ENSMUSG00000020513
UniProt	Q9UJT1	Q9R1K7
RefSeq (mRNA)	NM_001193609; NM_001193610; NM_001193611; NM_001193612; NM_001193613 NM_016261	NM_001199045; NM_001199046; NM_001199047; NM_019756
RefSeq (protein)	NP_001180538; NP_001180539; NP_001180540; NP_001180541; NP_001180542 NP_057345	NP_001185974; NP_001185975; NP_001185976; NP_062730
Location (UCSC)	Chr 17: 59.86 – 59.89 Mb	Chr 11: 86.44 – 86.46 Mb
PubMed search
- Wikidata
View/Edit Human	View/Edit Mouse

Tubulin, delta 1 is a protein in humans that is encoded by the TUBD1 gene.
