= CCL4L1 =

Protein found in humans

Identifiers
- Aliases: CCL4L1, AT744.2, CCL4L, LAG-1, LAG1, SCYA4L, SCYA4L1, MIP-1-beta, SCYA4L2, C-C motif chemokine ligand 4 like 1
- External IDs: OMIM: 603782; GeneCards: CCL4L1
Gene ontology
Molecular function	chemokine activity; cytokine activity; protein binding; CCR chemokine receptor binding
Cellular component	extracellular region; extracellular space
Biological process	lymphocyte chemotaxis; chemokine-mediated signaling pathway; cellular response to tumor necrosis factor; G protein-coupled receptor signaling pathway; positive regulation of GTPase activity; chemotaxis; inflammatory response; cellular response to interleukin-1; monocyte chemotaxis; neutrophil chemotaxis; immune response; positive regulation of ERK1 and ERK2 cascade; cellular response to interferon-gamma; regulation of signaling receptor activity; eosinophil chemotaxis
Sources:Amigo / QuickGO
Orthologs
Databases	NCBI: entry
Species	Human	Mouse
Entrez	388372	n/a
Ensembl	n/a	n/a
UniProt	Q8NHW4	n/a
RefSeq (mRNA)	NM_207007	n/a
RefSeq (protein)	NP_996890	n/a
Location (UCSC)	n/a	n/a
PubMed search		n/a
- Wikidata
View/Edit Human

C-C motif chemokine 4-like is a protein that in humans is encoded by the CCL4L1 gene.

== Function ==
This gene is one of several cytokine genes clustered on the q-arm of chromosome 17. Cytokines are a family of secreted proteins involved in immunoregulatory and inflammatory processes. This protein is similar to CCL4 which inhibits HIV entry by binding to the cellular receptor CCR5. The copy number of this gene varies among individuals; most individuals have 1-5 copies in the diploid genome, although rare individuals do not contain this gene at all. The human genome reference assembly contains two copies of this gene. This record represents the more centromeric gene.
