= OR1D4 =

Protein-coding gene in the species Homo sapiens

Identifiers
- Aliases: OR1D4, OR17-30, olfactory receptor family 1 subfamily D member 4 (gene/pseudogene), olfactory receptor family 1 subfamily D member 4
- External IDs: GeneCards: OR1D4

Gene location (Human)
Chr.	Chromosome 17 (human)
Band	17p13.3	Start	3,235,703 bp
Band	17p13.3	End	3,241,614 bp
RNA expression pattern
Bgee	Human / Mouse (ortholog); Top expressed in: testicle; gonad; blood / n/a; More reference expression data
BioGPS	n/a
Orthologs
Databases	NCBI: entry; OMA: entry
Species	Human	Mouse
Entrez	653166	n/a
Ensembl	ENSG00000255095	n/a
UniProt	n a	n/a
RefSeq (mRNA)	NM_003552	n/a
RefSeq (protein)	n/a	n/a
Location (UCSC)	Chr 17: 3.24 – 3.24 Mb	n/a
PubMed search		n/a
- Wikidata
View/Edit Human

Olfactory receptor 1D4 is a protein that in humans is encoded by the OR1D4 gene.

Olfactory receptors interact with odorant molecules in the nose, to initiate a neuronal response that triggers the perception of a smell. The olfactory receptor proteins are members of a large family of G-protein-coupled receptors (GPCR) arising from single coding-exon genes. Olfactory receptors share a 7-transmembrane domain structure with many neurotransmitter and hormone receptors and are responsible for the recognition and G protein-mediated transduction of odorant signals. The olfactory receptor gene family is the largest in the genome. The nomenclature assigned to the olfactory receptor genes and proteins for this organism is independent of other organisms.

== See also ==
- Olfactory receptor
