= ST6GALNAC2 =

Gene in humans

Identifiers
- Aliases: ST6GALNAC2, SAITL1, SIAT7, SIAT7B, SIATL1, ST6GalNAII, STHM, ST6 N-acetylgalactosaminide alpha-2,6-sialyltransferase 2
- External IDs: OMIM: 610137; MGI: 107553; GeneCards: ST6GALNAC2
Enzyme activity
| EC # | BRENDA | ExPASy | KEGG | MetaCyc |
|---|---|---|---|---|
| 2.4.3.3 | ↗ | ↗ | ↗ | ↗ |

Gene location (Human)
| Chr. | Chromosome 17 (human) |
| Band | 17q25.1 | Start | 76,565,377 bp |
| Band | 17q25.1 | End | 76,586,956 bp |

Gene location (Mouse)
| Chr. | Chromosome 11 (mouse) |
| Band | 11|11 E2 | Start | 116,566,129 bp |
| Band | 11|11 E2 | End | 116,585,694 bp |
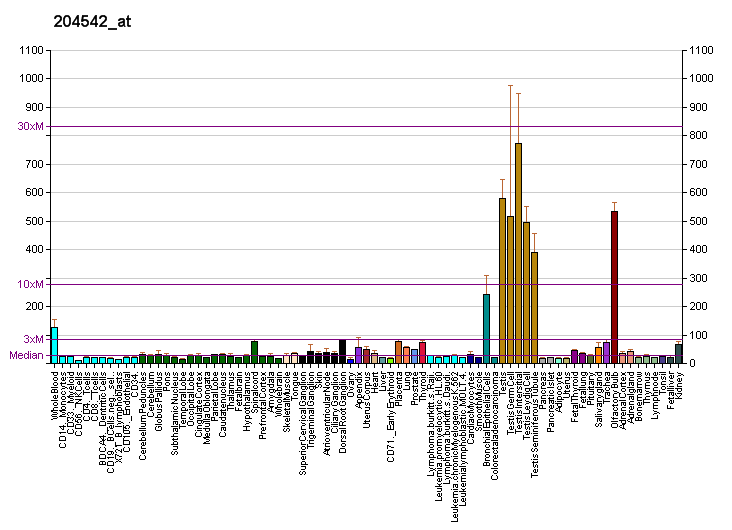
RNA expression pattern
| Bgee | Human / Mouse (ortholog); Top expressed in: tibial nerve; right uterine tube; right testis; left testis; sural nerve; olfactory zone of nasal mucosa; skin of abdomen; blood; skin of leg; testicle / Top expressed in: seminiferous tubule; superior surface of tongue; gallbladder; corneal stroma; right kidney; submandibular gland; choroid plexus of fourth ventricle; crypt of lieberkuhn of small intestine; human kidney; conjunctival fornix; More reference expression data |
| BioGPS | More reference expression data |
Gene ontology
| Molecular function | glycosyltransferase activity; transferase activity; sialyltransferase activity; alpha-N-acetylgalactosaminide alpha-2,6-sialyltransferase activity |
| Cellular component | integral component of membrane; Golgi apparatus; membrane; Golgi membrane |
| Biological process | sialylation; oligosaccharide metabolic process; O-glycan processing; protein N-linked glycosylation via asparagine; protein glycosylation; protein O-linked glycosylation; protein sialylation |
Sources:Amigo / QuickGO
Orthologs
| Databases | NCBI: entry; OMA: entry |
| Species | Human | Mouse |
| Entrez | 10610 | 20446 |
| Ensembl | ENSG00000070731 | ENSMUSG00000057286 |
| UniProt | Q9UJ37 | P70277 |
| RefSeq (mRNA) | NM_006456 | NM_009180 |
| RefSeq (protein) | NP_006447 | NP_033206 |
| Location (UCSC) | Chr 17: 76.57 – 76.59 Mb | Chr 11: 116.57 – 116.59 Mb |
| PubMed search |
- Wikidata
| View/Edit Human | View/Edit Mouse |

Alpha-N-acetylgalactosaminide alpha-2,6-sialyltransferase 2 is an enzyme that in humans is encoded by the ST6GALNAC2 gene.

== See also ==
- Alpha-N-acetylgalactosaminide alpha-2,6-sialyltransferase
