= Chromosome 17 open reading frame 67 =

Protein found in humans

C17orf67

Identifiers
- Aliases: C17orf67, chromosome 17 open reading frame 67
- External IDs: MGI: 2685371; HomoloGene: 129636; GeneCards: C17orf67; OMA:C17orf67 - orthologs

Gene location (Human)
| Chr. | Chromosome 17 (human) |
| Band | 17q22 | Start | 56,791,913 bp |
| Band | 17q22 | End | 56,838,773 bp |

Gene location (Mouse)
| Chr. | Chromosome 11 (mouse) |
| Band | 11|11 C | Start | 88,964,667 bp |
| Band | 11|11 C | End | 88,983,866 bp |
RNA expression pattern
| Bgee | Human / Mouse (ortholog); Top expressed in: testicle; thymus; gonad; right lobe of liver; spleen; jejunum; granulocyte; jejunal mucosa; body of uterus; hypothalamus / Top expressed in: morula; thymus; spermatid; spermatocyte; embryo; testicle; blastocyst; quadriceps femoris muscle; olfactory bulb; white adipose tissue; More reference expression data |
| BioGPS | n/a |
Orthologs
| Species | Human | Mouse |
| Entrez | 339210 | 217071 |
| Ensembl | ENSG00000214226 | ENSMUSG00000072553 |
| UniProt | Q0P5P2 | Q3V3I5 |
| RefSeq (mRNA) | NM_001085430 | NM_001033266 |
| RefSeq (protein) | NP_001078899 | NP_001028438 |
| Location (UCSC) | Chr 17: 56.79 – 56.84 Mb | Chr 11: 88.96 – 88.98 Mb |
| PubMed search |
- Wikidata
| View/Edit Human | View/Edit Mouse |

Chromosome 17 open reading frame 67 is a protein that in humans is encoded by the C17orf67 gene.
