= MicroRNA 4727 =

Non-coding RNA in the species Homo sapiens

MIR4727

Identifiers
- Aliases: MIR4727, mir-4727, microRNA 4727
- External IDs: GeneCards: MIR4727; OMA:MIR4727 - orthologs

Gene location (Human)
| Chr. | Chromosome 17 (human) |
| Band | 17q12 | Start | 38,825,838 bp |
| Band | 17q12 | End | 38,825,892 bp |
RNA expression pattern
| Bgee | Human / Mouse (ortholog); Top expressed in: bone marrow; putamen; blood; stomach; gastrocnemius muscle; monocyte; islet of Langerhans; spleen; human kidney; anterior cingulate cortex / n/a; More reference expression data |
| BioGPS | n/a |
Orthologs
| Species | Human | Mouse |
| Entrez | 100616416 | n/a |
| Ensembl | ENSG00000274054 | n/a |
| UniProt | n a | n/a |
| RefSeq (mRNA) | n/a | n/a |
| RefSeq (protein) | n/a | n/a |
| Location (UCSC) | Chr 17: 38.83 – 38.83 Mb | n/a |
| PubMed search | | n/a |
- Wikidata
| View/Edit Human |

MicroRNA 4727 is a microRNA that in humans is produced by the MIR4727 gene.

== Function ==
microRNAs (miRNAs) are short (20–24 nt) non-coding RNAs that are involved in post-transcriptional regulation of gene expression in multicellular organisms by affecting both the stability and translation of mRNAs. miRNAs are transcribed by RNA polymerase II as part of capped and polyadenylated primary transcripts (pri-miRNAs) that can be either protein-coding or non-coding. The primary transcript is cleaved by the Drosha ribonuclease III enzyme to produce an approximately 70-nt stem-loop precursor miRNA (pre-miRNA), which is further cleaved by the cytoplasmic Dicer ribonuclease to generate the mature miRNA and antisense miRNA star (miRNA*) products. The mature miRNA is incorporated into a RNA-induced silencing complex (RISC), which recognizes target mRNAs through imperfect base pairing with the miRNA and most commonly results in translational inhibition or destabilization of the target mRNA. The RefSeq represents the predicted microRNA stem-loop. [provided by RefSeq, Sep 2009].
