= FAM106A =

Protein-coding gene in the species Homo sapiens

Identifiers
- Aliases: FAM106A, family with sequence similarity 106 member A
- External IDs: GeneCards: FAM106A

Gene location (Human)
Chr.	Chromosome 17 (human)
Band	17p11.2	Start	18,511,221 bp
Band	17p11.2	End	18,551,705 bp
RNA expression pattern
Bgee	Human / Mouse (ortholog); Top expressed in: right hemisphere of cerebellum; buccal mucosa cell; gastric mucosa; right testis; testicle; left testis; body of pancreas; epithelium of colon; left ovary; body of uterus / n/a; More reference expression data
BioGPS	n/a
Orthologs
Databases	NCBI: entry; OMA: entry
Species	Human	Mouse
Entrez	80039	n/a
Ensembl	ENSG00000273018	n/a
UniProt	Q4KMX7	n/a
RefSeq (mRNA)	NM_024974	n/a
RefSeq (protein)	NP_079250	n/a
Location (UCSC)	Chr 17: 18.51 – 18.55 Mb	n/a
PubMed search		n/a
- Wikidata
View/Edit Human

Family with sequence similarity 106 member A is a long non-coding RNA that in humans is produced by the FAM106A gene.
