= Schlafen family member 13 =

Protein-coding gene in the species Homo sapiens

SLFN13

Identifiers
- Aliases: SLFN13, SLFN10, schlafen family member 13, hSLFN13
- External IDs: OMIM: 614957; MGI: 2672859; HomoloGene: 45432; GeneCards: SLFN13; OMA:SLFN13 - orthologs

Gene location (Human)
Chr.	Chromosome 17 (human)
Band	17q12	Start	35,435,096 bp
Band	17q12	End	35,448,837 bp

Gene location (Mouse)
Chr.	Chromosome 11 (mouse)
Band	11|11 C	Start	82,892,984 bp
Band	11|11 C	End	82,911,636 bp
RNA expression pattern
Bgee	Human / Mouse (ortholog); Top expressed in: right uterine tube; bronchial epithelial cell; olfactory zone of nasal mucosa; bone marrow cell; granulocyte; minor salivary glands; mucosa of paranasal sinus; appendix; spleen; gallbladder / Top expressed in: spleen; granulocyte; thymus; bone marrow; embryo; ovary; embryo; zone of skin; jejunum; liver; More reference expression data
BioGPS	n/a
Gene ontology
Molecular function	ATP binding; nucleotide binding; endoribonuclease activity; zinc ion binding; nuclease activity; endonuclease activity; hydrolase activity; metal ion binding; tRNA binding
Cellular component	intracellular anatomical structure; cytoplasm
Biological process	rRNA catabolic process; tRNA catabolic process; RNA phosphodiester bond hydrolysis, endonucleolytic; nucleic acid phosphodiester bond hydrolysis; defense response to virus
Sources:Amigo / QuickGO
Orthologs
Species	Human	Mouse
Entrez	146857	276950
Ensembl	ENSG00000154760	ENSMUSG00000035208
UniProt	Q68D06	B1ARD8
RefSeq (mRNA)	NM_144682	NM_001167743; NM_181545
RefSeq (protein)	NP_653283	NP_001161215; NP_853523
Location (UCSC)	Chr 17: 35.44 – 35.45 Mb	Chr 11: 82.89 – 82.91 Mb
PubMed search
- Wikidata
View/Edit Human	View/Edit Mouse

Schlafen family member 13 is a protein that in humans is encoded by the SLFN13 gene.
