= NME1-NME2 =

Protein-coding gene in humans

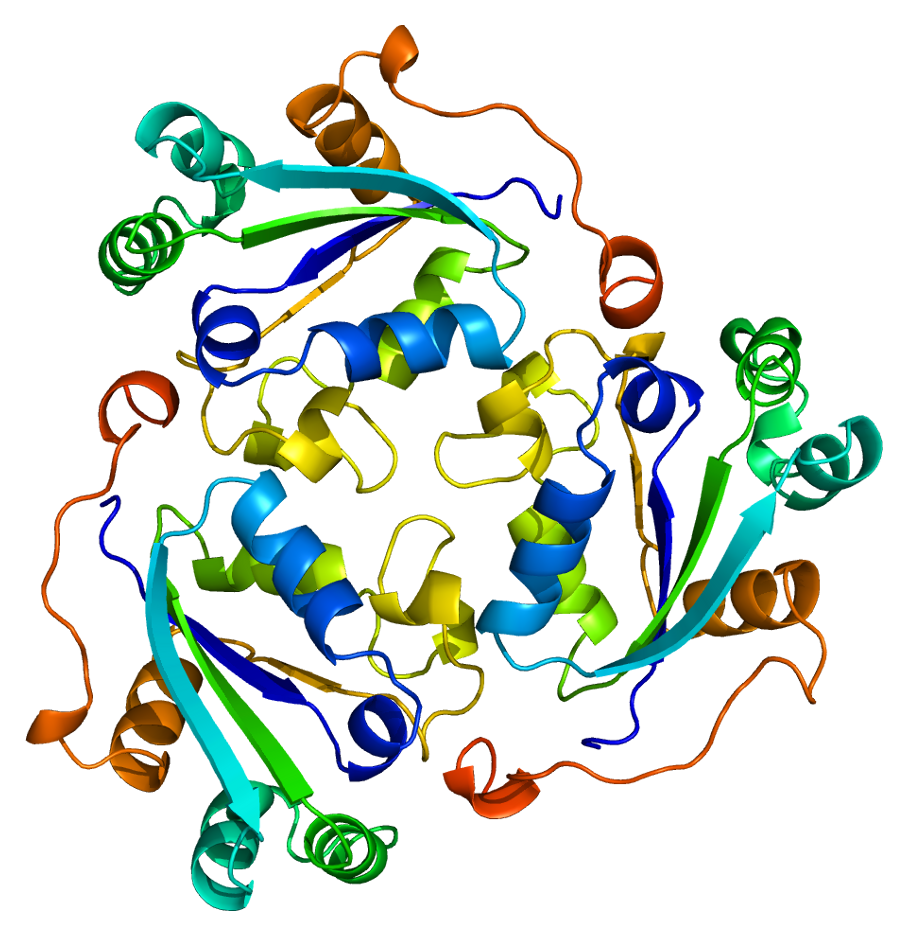

Identifiers
- Aliases: NME1-NME2, NM23-LV, NMELV, NME1-NME2 readthrough
- External IDs: MGI: 3648428; GeneCards: NME1-NME2
Available structures
PDB	Human UniProt search: PDBe RCSB
PDB	List of PDB id codes 3BBB, 3BBF, 1NSK, 3BBC, 1NUE
Enzyme activity
EC #	BRENDA	ExPASy	KEGG	MetaCyc
2.7.4.6	↗	↗	↗	↗
2.7.13.3	↗	↗	↗	↗

Gene location (Human)
Chr.	Chromosome 17 (human)
Band	17q21.33	Start	51,153,590 bp
Band	17q21.33	End	51,171,744 bp
RNA expression pattern
Bgee	Human / Mouse (ortholog); Top expressed in: gonad; stromal cell of endometrium; prefrontal cortex; testicle; appendix; dorsolateral prefrontal cortex; Brodmann area 9; right adrenal gland; mucosa of transverse colon; islet of Langerhans / n/a; More reference expression data
BioGPS	n/a
Gene ontology
Molecular function	transferase activity; DNA binding; nucleotide binding; protein histidine kinase activity; DNA-binding transcription factor activity; metal ion binding; kinase activity; protein binding; ATP binding; nucleoside diphosphate kinase activity; protein serine/threonine kinase activity; fatty acid binding; intermediate filament binding; enzyme binding; transcription coactivator activity; GDP binding; G-quadruplex DNA binding
Cellular component	cytoplasm; cytosol; cell projection; focal adhesion; ruffle; extracellular exosome; nucleus; cell periphery; lamellipodium; extracellular region; secretory granule lumen; ficolin-1-rich granule lumen; intermediate filament; mitochondrial membranes; perinuclear region of cytoplasm
Biological process	UTP biosynthetic process; peptidyl-histidine phosphorylation; nucleobase-containing small molecule interconversion; CTP biosynthetic process; regulation of transcription, DNA-templated; phosphorylation; positive regulation of epithelial cell proliferation; positive regulation of keratinocyte differentiation; negative regulation of apoptotic process; nucleotide metabolic process; nucleoside diphosphate phosphorylation; transcription, DNA-templated; cell adhesion; nucleoside triphosphate biosynthetic process; integrin-mediated signaling pathway; GTP biosynthetic process; regulation of epidermis development; positive regulation of transcription by RNA polymerase II; neutrophil degranulation; negative regulation of myeloid leukocyte differentiation; positive regulation of neuron projection development; cellular response to oxidative stress; protein autophosphorylation; protein complex oligomerization; response to growth hormone; cellular response to glucose stimulus; cellular response to fatty acid; adenylate cyclase-activating G protein-coupled receptor signaling pathway; positive regulation of transcription, DNA-templated
Sources:Amigo / QuickGO
Orthologs
Databases	NCBI: entry; OMA: entry
Species	Human	Mouse
Entrez	654364	433968
Ensembl	ENSG00000011052	n/a
UniProt	P22392	n/a
RefSeq (mRNA)	NM_001018136	n/a
RefSeq (protein)	NP_001018147; NP_001018148; NP_001018149; NP_001185611; NP_002503 NP_001018146	n/a
Location (UCSC)	Chr 17: 51.15 – 51.17 Mb	n/a
PubMed search
- Wikidata
View/Edit Human	View/Edit Mouse

NM23-LV (also known as NME1-NME2) is a human gene.

The NME1-NME2 mRNA is a naturally occurring co-transcribed product of the neighboring NME1 and NME2 genes. The significance of this co-transcribed mRNA and the function of its predicted protein product have not yet been determined.

Alternative splicing of this gene results in different transcript variants encoding distinct isoforms, but the full-length nature of each variant has not been defined.
