= Ring finger protein 157 =

Protein-coding gene in the species Homo sapiens

RNF157

Identifiers
- Aliases: RNF157, ring finger protein 157
- External IDs: MGI: 2442484; GeneCards: RNF157
Enzyme activity
EC #	BRENDA	ExPASy	KEGG	MetaCyc
2.3.2.27	↗	↗	↗	↗

Gene location (Human)
Chr.	Chromosome 17 (human)
Band	17q25.1	Start	76,142,465 bp
Band	17q25.1	End	76,240,493 bp

Gene location (Mouse)
Chr.	Chromosome 11 (mouse)
Band	11|11 E2	Start	116,227,179 bp
Band	11|11 E2	End	116,303,858 bp
RNA expression pattern
Bgee	Human / Mouse (ortholog); Top expressed in: lateral nuclear group of thalamus; right frontal lobe; cingulate gyrus; anterior cingulate cortex; dorsolateral prefrontal cortex; Brodmann area 9; pars compacta; prefrontal cortex; pars reticulata; gastrocnemius muscle / Top expressed in: motor neuron; facial motor nucleus; trigeminal ganglion; substantia nigra; dentate gyrus of hippocampal formation granule cell; Region I of hippocampus proper; superior frontal gyrus; visual cortex; primary visual cortex; retinal pigment epithelium; More reference expression data
BioGPS	n/a
Gene ontology
Molecular function	metal ion binding; transferase activity; ubiquitin protein ligase activity
Cellular component	cytoplasm; cell body
Biological process	protein ubiquitination; negative regulation of apoptotic process; protein autoubiquitination; positive regulation of dendrite extension
Sources:Amigo / QuickGO
Orthologs
Databases	NCBI: entry; OMA: entry
Species	Human	Mouse
Entrez	114804	217340
Ensembl	ENSG00000141576	ENSMUSG00000052949
UniProt	Q96PX1	Q3TEL6
RefSeq (mRNA)	NM_052916; NM_001330501	NM_027258
RefSeq (protein)	NP_001317430; NP_443148	n/a
Location (UCSC)	Chr 17: 76.14 – 76.24 Mb	Chr 11: 116.23 – 116.3 Mb
PubMed search
- Wikidata
View/Edit Human	View/Edit Mouse

Ring finger protein 157 is a protein that in humans is encoded by the RNF157 gene.
