= ZNF207 =

Protein-coding gene in the species Homo sapiens

Identifiers
- Aliases: ZNF207, BuGZ, hBuGZ, zinc finger protein 207
- External IDs: OMIM: 603428; MGI: 1340045; GeneCards: ZNF207

Gene location (Human)
Chr.	Chromosome 17 (human)
Band	17q11.2	Start	32,350,132 bp
Band	17q11.2	End	32,381,885 bp

Gene location (Mouse)
Chr.	Chromosome 11 (mouse)
Band	11|11 B5	Start	80,383,279 bp
Band	11|11 B5	End	80,405,733 bp
RNA expression pattern
Bgee	Human / Mouse (ortholog); Top expressed in: embryo; ventricular zone; ganglionic eminence; lymph node; monocyte; left ovary; ectocervix; rectum; tonsil; minor salivary glands / Top expressed in: genital tubercle; tail of embryo; hand; abdominal wall; mandibular prominence; ventricular zone; medial ganglionic eminence; maxillary prominence; epiblast; zygote; More reference expression data
BioGPS	n/a
Gene ontology
Molecular function	DNA binding; heparin binding; DNA-binding transcription factor activity; microtubule binding; zinc ion binding; metal ion binding; protein binding; RNA binding; nucleic acid binding
Cellular component	cytoplasm; spindle; chromosome; nucleolus; spindle matrix; microtubule; chromosome, centromeric region; cytoskeleton; nucleus; kinetochore; nucleoplasm
Biological process	regulation of transcription, DNA-templated; chromosome segregation; protein stabilization; microtubule polymerization; mitotic spindle assembly checkpoint signaling; cell division; regulation of chromosome segregation; mitotic spindle assembly; microtubule bundle formation; mitotic sister chromatid segregation; cell cycle; attachment of spindle microtubules to kinetochore
Sources:Amigo / QuickGO
Orthologs
Databases	NCBI: entry; OMA: entry
Species	Human	Mouse
Entrez	7756	22680
Ensembl	ENSG00000010244	ENSMUSG00000017421
UniProt	O43670	Q9JMD0
RefSeq (mRNA)	NM_001032293; NM_001098507; NM_003457	NM_001130169; NM_001130170; NM_001130171; NM_011751; NM_001362721
RefSeq (protein)	NP_001027464; NP_001091977; NP_003448	NP_001123641; NP_001123642; NP_001123643; NP_035881; NP_001349650
Location (UCSC)	Chr 17: 32.35 – 32.38 Mb	Chr 11: 80.38 – 80.41 Mb
PubMed search
- Wikidata
View/Edit Human	View/Edit Mouse

BUB3-interacting and GLEBS motif-containing protein ZNF207 is a protein in humans that is encoded by the ZNF207 gene.

== See also ==
- BUB3, mitotic checkpoint protein BUB3
- Zinc finger
