= MT-RNR2-like 1 =

Protein-coding gene in the species Homo sapiens

MTRNR2L1

Identifiers
- Aliases: MTRNR2L1, HN1, MT-RNR2-like 1, MT-RNR2 like 1, MT-RNR2 like 1 (pseudogene)
- External IDs: OMIM: 616985; GeneCards: MTRNR2L1; OMA:MTRNR2L1 - orthologs

Gene location (Human)
Chr.	Chromosome 17 (human)
Band	17p11.2	Start	22,523,415 bp
Band	17p11.2	End	22,524,663 bp
RNA expression pattern
Bgee	Human / Mouse (ortholog); Top expressed in: sural nerve; stomach; brain; colon; heart; substantia nigra; muscle tissue; cerebellum; testicle; prefrontal cortex / n/a; More reference expression data
BioGPS	n/a
Gene ontology
Molecular function	receptor antagonist activity
Cellular component	cytoplasm; extracellular region
Biological process	extracellular negative regulation of signal transduction; negative regulation of execution phase of apoptosis; negative regulation of signaling receptor activity
Sources:Amigo / QuickGO
Orthologs
Species	Human	Mouse
Entrez	100462977	n/a
Ensembl	ENSG00000256618	n/a
UniProt	P0CJ68	n/a
RefSeq (mRNA)	NM_001190452	n/a
RefSeq (protein)	NP_001177381	n/a
Location (UCSC)	Chr 17: 22.52 – 22.52 Mb	n/a
PubMed search		n/a
- Wikidata
View/Edit Human

MT-RNR2-like 1 is a protein that in humans is encoded by the MTRNR2L1 gene.
