= MYCBPAP =

Protein-coding gene in the species Homo sapiens

Identifiers
- Aliases: MYCBPAP, AMAP-1, AMAP1, MYCBP associated protein
- External IDs: OMIM: 609835; MGI: 2388726; HomoloGene: 49982; GeneCards: MYCBPAP; OMA:MYCBPAP - orthologs

Gene location (Human)
Chr.	Chromosome 17 (human)
Band	17q21.33	Start	50,508,384 bp
Band	17q21.33	End	50,531,501 bp

Gene location (Mouse)
Chr.	Chromosome 11 (mouse)
Band	11|11 D	Start	94,392,173 bp
Band	11|11 D	End	94,412,568 bp
RNA expression pattern
Bgee	Human / Mouse (ortholog); Top expressed in: left testis; right testis; right uterine tube; sperm; left ovary; right ovary; testicle; right hemisphere of cerebellum; olfactory zone of nasal mucosa; bronchial epithelial cell / Top expressed in: spermatid; seminiferous tubule; lateral recess; spermatocyte; blastocyst; choroid plexus of lateral ventricle; morula; embryo; Epithelium of choroid plexus; right kidney; More reference expression data
BioGPS	n/a
Gene ontology
Molecular function	protein binding
Cellular component	cytoplasm; membrane
Biological process	multicellular organism development; cell differentiation; spermatogenesis; chemical synaptic transmission
Sources:Amigo / QuickGO
Orthologs
Species	Human	Mouse
Entrez	84073	104601
Ensembl	ENSG00000136449	ENSMUSG00000039110
UniProt	Q8TBZ2	Q5SUV2
RefSeq (mRNA)	NM_032133; NM_001366294	NM_170671
RefSeq (protein)	NP_115509; NP_001353223	NP_733771
Location (UCSC)	Chr 17: 50.51 – 50.53 Mb	Chr 11: 94.39 – 94.41 Mb
PubMed search
- Wikidata
View/Edit Human	View/Edit Mouse

MYCBP associated protein is a protein that in humans is encoded by the MYCBPAP gene.
