= MGAT5B =

Protein-coding gene in the species Homo sapiens

Identifiers
- Aliases: MGAT5B, GnT-IX, GnT-VB, mannosyl (alpha-1,6-)-glycoprotein beta-1,6-N-acetyl-glucosaminyltransferase, isozyme B, alpha-1,6-mannosylglycoprotein 6-beta-N-acetylglucosaminyltransferase B
- External IDs: OMIM: 612441; MGI: 3606200; GeneCards: MGAT5B
Enzyme activity
EC #	BRENDA	ExPASy	KEGG	MetaCyc
2.4.1.155	↗	↗	↗	↗

Gene location (Human)
Chr.	Chromosome 17 (human)
Band	17q25.2	Start	76,868,404 bp
Band	17q25.2	End	76,950,393 bp

Gene location (Mouse)
Chr.	Chromosome 11 (mouse)
Band	11|11 E2	Start	116,809,689 bp
Band	11|11 E2	End	116,877,774 bp
RNA expression pattern
Bgee	Human / Mouse (ortholog); Top expressed in: right frontal lobe; Brodmann area 9; oocyte; cingulate gyrus; anterior cingulate cortex; putamen; prefrontal cortex; caudate nucleus; nucleus accumbens; amygdala / Top expressed in: dentate gyrus of hippocampal formation granule cell; superior frontal gyrus; primary visual cortex; lumbar subsegment of spinal cord; ventricular zone; ganglionic eminence; medial dorsal nucleus; superior colliculus; piriform cortex; lateral geniculate nucleus; More reference expression data
BioGPS	n/a
Gene ontology
Molecular function	transferase activity; protein binding; metal ion binding; glycosyltransferase activity; alpha-1,6-mannosylglycoprotein 6-beta-N-acetylglucosaminyltransferase activity; manganese ion binding
Cellular component	integral component of membrane; Golgi membrane; membrane; Golgi apparatus
Biological process	protein glycosylation; protein N-linked glycosylation; protein O-linked glycosylation via serine
Sources:Amigo / QuickGO
Orthologs
Databases	NCBI: entry; OMA: entry
Species	Human	Mouse
Entrez	146664	268510
Ensembl	ENSG00000167889	ENSMUSG00000043857
UniProt	Q3V5L5	Q765H6
RefSeq (mRNA)	NM_001199172; NM_144677; NM_198955	NM_172948
RefSeq (protein)	NP_001186101; NP_653278; NP_945193	NP_766536
Location (UCSC)	Chr 17: 76.87 – 76.95 Mb	Chr 11: 116.81 – 116.88 Mb
PubMed search
- Wikidata
View/Edit Human	View/Edit Mouse

Alpha-1,6-mannosylglycoprotein 6-beta-N-acetylglucosaminyltransferase B is an enzyme that in humans is encoded by the MGAT5B gene.
