= OR1E1 =

Protein-coding gene in the species Homo sapiens

Identifiers
- Aliases: OR1E1, HGM071, OR13-66, OR17-2, OR17-32, OR1E5, OR1E6, OR1E8P, OR1E9P, OST547, olfactory receptor family 1 subfamily E member 1
- External IDs: MGI: 3030231; GeneCards: OR1E1

Gene location (Human)
Chr.	Chromosome 17 (human)
Band	17p13.3	Start	3,397,104 bp
Band	17p13.3	End	3,398,410 bp

Gene location (Mouse)
Chr.	Chromosome 11 (mouse)
Band	11|11 B4	Start	73,851,643 bp
Band	11|11 B4	End	73,858,638 bp
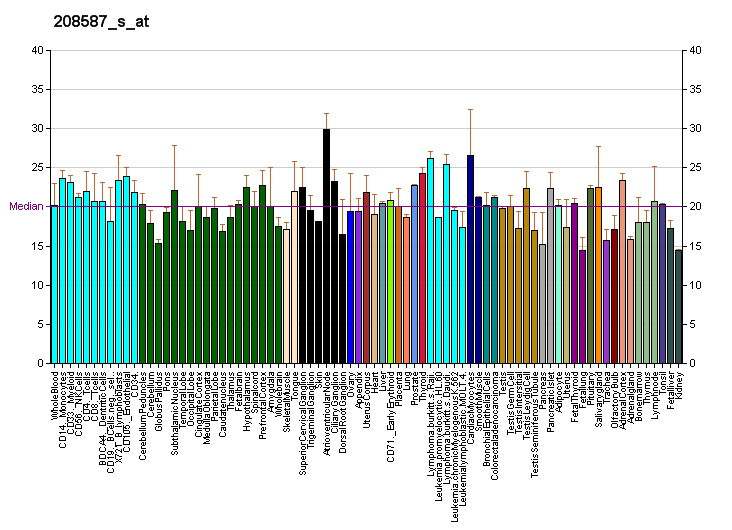

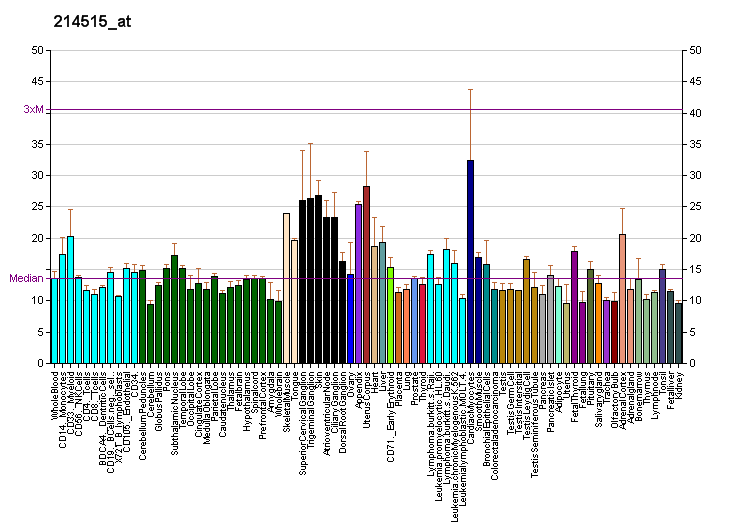
RNA expression pattern
Bgee	Human / Mouse (ortholog); Top expressed in: muscle of thigh; gastrocnemius muscle; placenta; mammary gland; female breast; lactiferous gland; prefrontal cortex; temporal lobe; tibial nerve; sigmoid colon / n/a; More reference expression data
BioGPS	More reference expression data
Gene ontology
Molecular function	G protein-coupled receptor activity; transmembrane signaling receptor activity; signal transducer activity; olfactory receptor activity
Cellular component	membrane; plasma membrane; integral component of membrane
Biological process	detection of chemical stimulus involved in sensory perception; signal transduction; response to stimulus; sensory perception of smell; detection of chemical stimulus involved in sensory perception of smell; G protein-coupled receptor signaling pathway
Sources:Amigo / QuickGO
Orthologs
Databases	NCBI: entry; OMA: entry
Species	Human	Mouse
Entrez	8387	258343
Ensembl	ENSG00000180016	ENSMUSG00000057050
UniProt	P30953	Q8VEZ6
RefSeq (mRNA)	NM_003553	NM_146346
RefSeq (protein)	NP_003544	NP_666458
Location (UCSC)	Chr 17: 3.4 – 3.4 Mb	Chr 11: 73.85 – 73.86 Mb
PubMed search
- Wikidata
View/Edit Human	View/Edit Mouse

Olfactory receptor 1E1 is a protein that in humans is encoded by the OR1E1 gene.

Olfactory receptors interact with odorant molecules in the nose, to initiate a neuronal response that triggers the perception of a smell. The olfactory receptor proteins are members of a large family of G-protein-coupled receptors (GPCR) arising from single coding-exon genes. Olfactory receptors share a 7-transmembrane domain structure with many neurotransmitter and hormone receptors and are responsible for the recognition and G protein-mediated transduction of odorant signals. The olfactory receptor gene family is the largest in the genome. The nomenclature assigned to the olfactory receptor genes and proteins for this organism is independent of other organisms.

== See also ==
- Olfactory receptor
