= OR3A2 =

Protein-coding gene in the species Homo sapiens

Identifiers
- Aliases: OR3A2, OLFRA04, OR17-14, OR17-228, OR228, olfactory receptor family 3 subfamily A member 2
- External IDs: MGI: 3030244; GeneCards: OR3A2

Gene location (Human)
Chr.	Chromosome 17 (human)
Band	17p13.3	Start	3,276,942 bp
Band	17p13.3	End	3,386,317 bp

Gene location (Mouse)
Chr.	Chromosome 11 (mouse)
Band	11|11 B5	Start	74,221,107 bp
Band	11|11 B5	End	74,228,857 bp
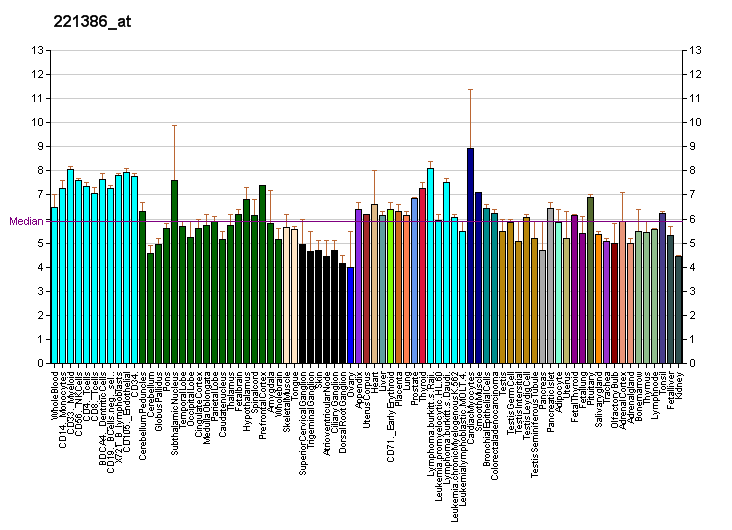
RNA expression pattern
Bgee	Human / Mouse (ortholog); Top expressed in: testicle; gonad; right testis; left testis; islet of Langerhans; ventricular zone; nucleus accumbens; sural nerve; caudate nucleus; granulocyte / n/a; More reference expression data
BioGPS	More reference expression data
Gene ontology
Molecular function	G protein-coupled receptor activity; olfactory receptor activity; signal transducer activity; signaling receptor activity
Cellular component	integral component of membrane; plasma membrane; integral component of plasma membrane; membrane
Biological process	sensory perception of chemical stimulus; sensory perception of smell; signal transduction; response to stimulus; detection of chemical stimulus involved in sensory perception of smell; G protein-coupled receptor signaling pathway
Sources:Amigo / QuickGO
Orthologs
Databases	NCBI: entry; OMA: entry
Species	Human	Mouse
Entrez	4995	258702
Ensembl	ENSG00000221882	ENSMUSG00000063116
UniProt	P47893	Q8VFX7
RefSeq (mRNA)	NM_002551	NM_146707
RefSeq (protein)	NP_002542	NP_666918
Location (UCSC)	Chr 17: 3.28 – 3.39 Mb	Chr 11: 74.22 – 74.23 Mb
PubMed search
- Wikidata
View/Edit Human	View/Edit Mouse

Olfactory receptor 3A2 is a protein that in humans is encoded by the OR3A2 gene.

Olfactory receptors interact with odorant molecules in the nose, to initiate a neuronal response that triggers the perception of a smell. The olfactory receptor proteins are members of a large family of G-protein-coupled receptors (GPCR) arising from single coding-exon genes. Olfactory receptors share a 7-transmembrane domain structure with many neurotransmitter and hormone receptors and are responsible for the recognition and G protein-mediated transduction of odorant signals. The olfactory receptor gene family is the largest in the genome. The nomenclature assigned to the olfactory receptor genes and proteins for this organism is independent of other organisms.

== See also ==
- Olfactory receptor
