= HIG1 hypoxia inducible domain family member 1B =

Protein-coding gene in the species Homo sapiens

HIGD1B
Available structures
PDB	Ortholog search: PDBe RCSB
PDB	List of PDB id codes 2LON

Identifiers
- Aliases: HIGD1B, CLST11240, CLST11240-15, HIG1 hypoxia inducible domain family member 1B
- External IDs: MGI: 1922939; HomoloGene: 9508; GeneCards: HIGD1B; OMA:HIGD1B - orthologs

Gene location (Human)
Chr.	Chromosome 17 (human)
Band	17q21.31	Start	44,846,353 bp
Band	17q21.31	End	44,850,476 bp

Gene location (Mouse)
Chr.	Chromosome 11 (mouse)
Band	11|11 E1	Start	102,726,675 bp
Band	11|11 E1	End	102,728,866 bp
RNA expression pattern
Bgee	Human / Mouse (ortholog); Top expressed in: apex of heart; right lung; upper lobe of left lung; left ventricle; putamen; caudate nucleus; anterior cingulate cortex; amygdala; right frontal lobe; nucleus accumbens / Top expressed in: interventricular septum; left lung lobe; right lung lobe; soleus muscle; lumbar subsegment of spinal cord; embryo; muscle of thigh; myocardium of ventricle; intercostal muscle; embryo; More reference expression data
BioGPS	n/a
Orthologs
Species	Human	Mouse
Entrez	51751	75689
Ensembl	ENSG00000131097	ENSMUSG00000020928
UniProt	Q9P298	Q99JY6
RefSeq (mRNA)	NM_001271880; NM_016438	NM_080846; NM_001357580
RefSeq (protein)	NP_001258809; NP_057522	NP_543122; NP_001344509
Location (UCSC)	Chr 17: 44.85 – 44.85 Mb	Chr 11: 102.73 – 102.73 Mb
PubMed search
- Wikidata
View/Edit Human	View/Edit Mouse

HIG1 hypoxia inducible domain family member 1B is a protein that in humans is encoded by the HIGD1B gene.

== Function ==
This gene encodes a member of the hypoxia inducible gene 1 (HIG1) domain family. The encoded protein is localized to the cell membrane and has been linked to tumorigenesis and the progression of pituitary adenomas. Alternative splicing results in multiple transcript variants.
