= RPAIN =

Protein-coding gene in the species Homo sapiens

Identifiers
- Aliases: RPAIN, HRIP, RIP, RPA interacting protein
- External IDs: OMIM: 617299; MGI: 1916973; HomoloGene: 13006; GeneCards: RPAIN; OMA:RPAIN - orthologs

Gene location (Human)
| Chr. | Chromosome 17 (human) |
| Band | 17p13.2 | Start | 5,419,641 bp |
| Band | 17p13.2 | End | 5,432,877 bp |

Gene location (Mouse)
| Chr. | Chromosome 11 (mouse) |
| Band | 11|11 B4 | Start | 70,861,039 bp |
| Band | 11|11 B4 | End | 70,868,659 bp |
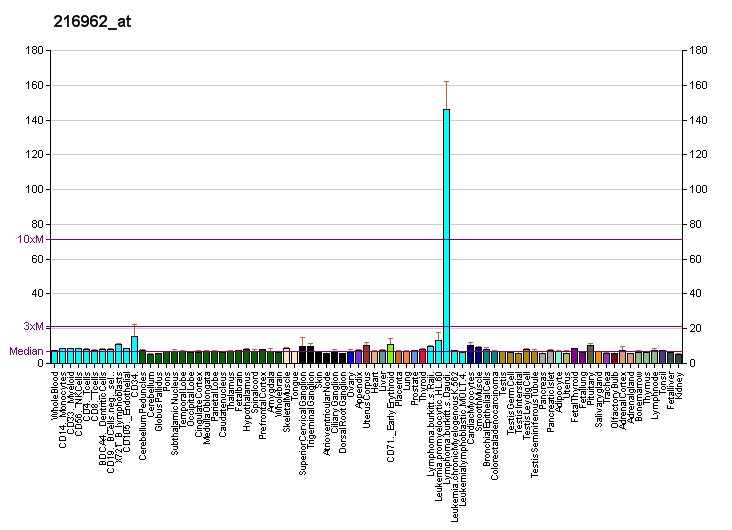
RNA expression pattern
| Bgee | Human / Mouse (ortholog); Top expressed in: ganglionic eminence; middle temporal gyrus; anterior pituitary; ventricular zone; sperm; left ovary; Brodmann area 23; right ovary; muscle of thigh; gastrocnemius muscle / Top expressed in: spermatid; spermatocyte; right kidney; yolk sac; lens; neural layer of retina; parotid gland; ascending aorta; neural tube; aortic valve; More reference expression data |
| BioGPS | More reference expression data |
Gene ontology
| Molecular function | metal ion binding; protein-containing complex binding |
| Cellular component | cytoplasm; PML body; nucleus; fibrillar center |
| Biological process | DNA-dependent DNA replication; DNA recombination; response to UV; DNA repair; protein import into nucleus |
Sources:Amigo / QuickGO
Orthologs
| Species | Human | Mouse |
| Entrez | 84268 | 69723 |
| Ensembl | ENSG00000129197 | ENSMUSG00000018449 |
| UniProt | Q86UA6 | Q9CWY9 |
| RefSeq (mRNA) | NM_001033002; NM_001160243; NM_001160244; NM_001160246; NM_001160266 NM_001160267; NM_032308 | NM_001252413; NM_001252414; NM_001252415; NM_027186 |
| RefSeq (protein) | NP_001028174; NP_001153715; NP_001153716; NP_001153718; NP_001153738 | NP_001239342; NP_001239343; NP_001239344; NP_081462 |
| Location (UCSC) | Chr 17: 5.42 – 5.43 Mb | Chr 11: 70.86 – 70.87 Mb |
| PubMed search |
- Wikidata
| View/Edit Human | View/Edit Mouse |

RPA-interacting protein is a protein that in humans is encoded by the RPAIN gene.

== See also ==
- Replication protein A (RPA)
