= SLFN11 =

Protein-coding gene in the species Homo sapiens

Identifiers
- Aliases: SLFN11, SLFN8/9, schlafen family member 11
- External IDs: OMIM: 614953; MGI: 2672859; HomoloGene: 89175; GeneCards: SLFN11; OMA:SLFN11 - orthologs

Gene location (Human)
Chr.	Chromosome 17 (human)
Band	17q12	Start	35,350,305 bp
Band	17q12	End	35,373,701 bp

Gene location (Mouse)
Chr.	Chromosome 11 (mouse)
Band	11|11 C	Start	82,892,984 bp
Band	11|11 C	End	82,911,636 bp
RNA expression pattern
Bgee	Human / Mouse (ortholog); Top expressed in: monocyte; Achilles tendon; sural nerve; bone marrow cells; right lobe of thyroid gland; left uterine tube; left lobe of thyroid gland; granulocyte; appendix; upper lobe of left lung / Top expressed in: spleen; granulocyte; thymus; bone marrow; embryo; ovary; embryo; zone of skin; jejunum; liver; More reference expression data
BioGPS	n/a
Gene ontology
Molecular function	tRNA binding; nucleotide binding; ATP binding; RNA binding; protein binding; ATPase activity; helicase activity; hydrolase activity
Cellular component	aggresome; nucleus; nucleoplasm; cytosol; site of DNA damage; chromosome
Biological process	negative regulation of G1/S transition of mitotic cell cycle; defense response to virus; immune system process; negative regulation of DNA replication; positive regulation of cell death; replication fork arrest; cellular response to DNA damage stimulus
Sources:Amigo / QuickGO
Orthologs
Species	Human	Mouse
Entrez	91607	276950
Ensembl	ENSG00000172716	ENSMUSG00000035208
UniProt	Q7Z7L1	B1ARD8
RefSeq (mRNA)	NM_001104587; NM_001104588; NM_001104589; NM_001104590; NM_152270 NM_001376007; NM_001376008; NM_001376009; NM_001376010; NM_001376011; NM_001376012; NM_001387158; NM_001387159; NM_001387160; NM_001387161; NM_001387162; NM_001387163	NM_001167743; NM_181545
RefSeq (protein)	NP_001098057; NP_001098058; NP_001098059; NP_001098060; NP_689483 NP_001362936; NP_001362937; NP_001362938; NP_001362939; NP_001362940; NP_001362941	NP_001161215; NP_853523
Location (UCSC)	Chr 17: 35.35 – 35.37 Mb	Chr 11: 82.89 – 82.91 Mb
PubMed search
- Wikidata
View/Edit Human	View/Edit Mouse

Schlafen family member 11 is a protein that in humans is encoded by the SLFN11 gene.
