= DRC3 =

Protein-coding gene in the species Homo sapiens

Identifiers
- Aliases: DRC3, LRRC48, CFAP134, dynein regulatory complex subunit 3
- External IDs: MGI: 1921915; GeneCards: DRC3

Gene location (Human)
Chr.	Chromosome 17 (human)
Band	17p11.2|17p11.2	Start	17,972,813 bp
Band	17p11.2|17p11.2	End	18,016,889 bp

Gene location (Mouse)
Chr.	Chromosome 11 (mouse)
Band	11|11 B2	Start	60,244,155 bp
Band	11|11 B2	End	60,285,167 bp
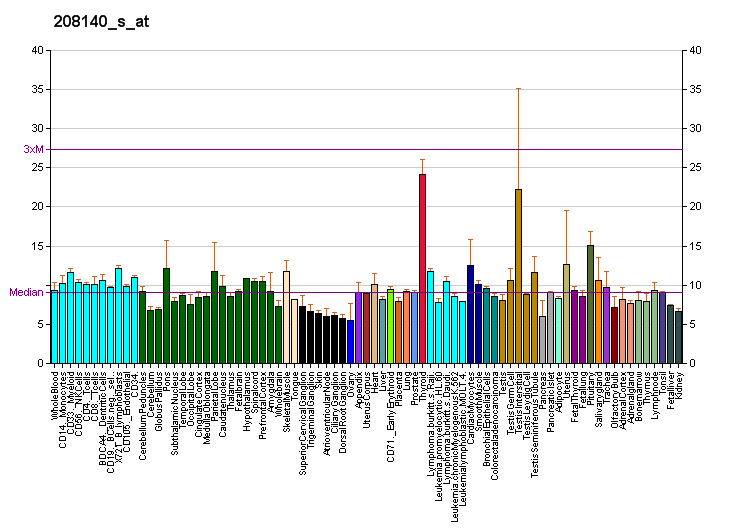
RNA expression pattern
Bgee	Human / Mouse (ortholog); Top expressed in: right uterine tube; bronchial epithelial cell; olfactory zone of nasal mucosa; mucosa of paranasal sinus; epithelium of nasopharynx; anterior pituitary; nasal epithelium; left testis; caput epididymis; right testis / Top expressed in: spermatocyte; spermatid; seminiferous tubule; interventricular septum; choroidal fissure; Epithelium of choroid plexus; respiratory epithelium; nasal epithelium; olfactory epithelium; utricle; More reference expression data
BioGPS	More reference expression data
Orthologs
Databases	NCBI: entry; OMA: entry
Species	Human	Mouse
Entrez	83450	74665
Ensembl	ENSG00000171962	ENSMUSG00000056598
UniProt	Q9H069	Q9D5E4
RefSeq (mRNA)	NM_001130090; NM_001130091; NM_001130092; NM_031294	NM_029044
RefSeq (protein)	NP_001123562; NP_001123563; NP_001123564; NP_112584	NP_083320
Location (UCSC)	Chr 17: 17.97 – 18.02 Mb	Chr 11: 60.24 – 60.29 Mb
PubMed search
- Wikidata
View/Edit Human	View/Edit Mouse

Dynein regulatory complex subunit 3 is a protein that in humans is encoded by the DRC3 gene.

== See also ==
- Dynein
- Protein subunit
