= SLFN12 =

Protein-coding gene in the species Homo sapiens

Identifiers
- Aliases: SLFN12, SLFN3, schlafen family member 12
- External IDs: OMIM: 614955; HomoloGene: 83283; GeneCards: SLFN12; OMA:SLFN12 - orthologs

Gene location (Human)
Chr.	Chromosome 17 (human)
Band	17q12	Start	35,410,922 bp
Band	17q12	End	35,433,283 bp
RNA expression pattern
Bgee	Human / Mouse (ortholog); Top expressed in: monocyte; Achilles tendon; gonad; granulocyte; right adrenal cortex; stromal cell of endometrium; gallbladder; Descending thoracic aorta; testicle; left adrenal gland / n/a; More reference expression data
BioGPS	n/a
Orthologs
Species	Human	Mouse
Entrez	55106	n/a
Ensembl	ENSG00000172123	n/a
UniProt	Q8IYM2	n/a
RefSeq (mRNA)	NM_001289009; NM_018042	n/a
RefSeq (protein)	NP_001275938; NP_060512	n/a
Location (UCSC)	Chr 17: 35.41 – 35.43 Mb	n/a
PubMed search		n/a
- Wikidata
View/Edit Human

Schlafen family member 12 is a protein in humans that is encoded by the SLFN12 gene.
