= OR4D2 =

Protein-coding gene in the species Homo sapiens

Identifiers
- Aliases: OR4D2, BC2009, OR17-24, olfactory receptor family 4 subfamily D member 2
- External IDs: MGI: 3030297; GeneCards: OR4D2

Gene location (Human)
Chr.	Chromosome 17 (human)
Band	17q22	Start	58,166,982 bp
Band	17q22	End	58,171,411 bp

Gene location (Mouse)
Chr.	Chromosome 11 (mouse)
Band	11|11 C	Start	87,783,444 bp
Band	11|11 C	End	87,788,213 bp
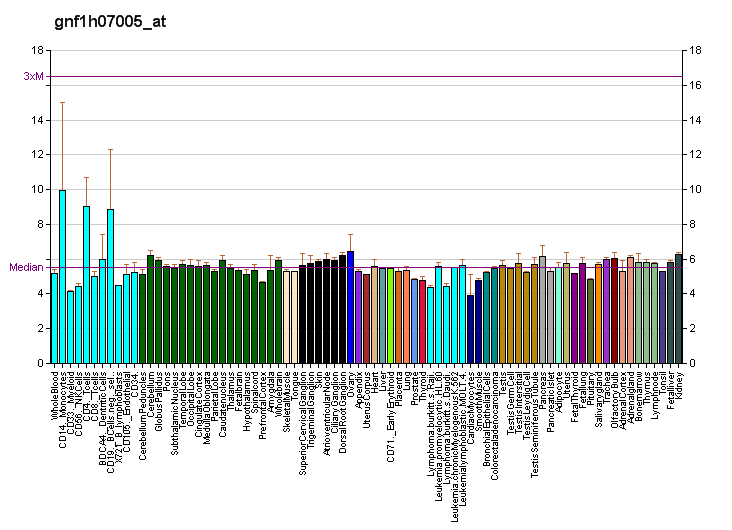
RNA expression pattern
Bgee	Human / Mouse (ortholog); Top expressed in: multicellular organism / n/a; More reference expression data
BioGPS	More reference expression data
Gene ontology
Molecular function	G protein-coupled receptor activity; olfactory receptor activity; transmembrane signaling receptor activity; signal transducer activity
Cellular component	integral component of membrane; plasma membrane; membrane
Biological process	sensory perception of smell; detection of chemical stimulus involved in sensory perception of smell; detection of chemical stimulus involved in sensory perception; signal transduction; response to stimulus; G protein-coupled receptor signaling pathway
Sources:Amigo / QuickGO
Orthologs
Databases	NCBI: entry; OMA: entry
Species	Human	Mouse
Entrez	124538	258408
Ensembl	ENSG00000255713	ENSMUSG00000093920
UniProt	P58180	Q5SW49
RefSeq (mRNA)	NM_001004707	NM_146413
RefSeq (protein)	NP_001004707	NP_666525
Location (UCSC)	Chr 17: 58.17 – 58.17 Mb	Chr 11: 87.78 – 87.79 Mb
PubMed search
- Wikidata
View/Edit Human	View/Edit Mouse

Olfactory receptor 4D2 is a protein that in humans is encoded by the OR4D2 gene.

== Function ==
Olfactory receptors interact with odorant molecules in the nose, to initiate a neuronal response that triggers the perception of a smell. The olfactory receptor proteins are members of a large family of G-protein-coupled receptors (GPCR) arising from single coding-exon genes. Olfactory receptors share a 7-transmembrane domain structure with many neurotransmitter and hormone receptors and are responsible for the recognition and G protein-mediated transduction of odorant signals. The olfactory receptor gene family is the largest in the genome. The nomenclature assigned to the olfactory receptor genes and proteins for this organism is independent of other organisms.

== See also ==
- Olfactory receptor
