= MBTD1 =

Protein-coding gene in the species Homo sapiens

Identifiers
- Aliases: MBTD1, SA49P01, mbt domain containing 1
- External IDs: MGI: 2143977; GeneCards: MBTD1
Available structures
PDB	Ortholog search: PDBe RCSB
PDB	List of PDB id codes 3FEO, 4C5I

Gene location (Human)
Chr.	Chromosome 17 (human)
Band	17q21.33	Start	51,177,425 bp
Band	17q21.33	End	51,260,163 bp

Gene location (Mouse)
Chr.	Chromosome 11 (mouse)
Band	11|11 D	Start	93,776,678 bp
Band	11|11 D	End	93,837,811 bp
RNA expression pattern
Bgee	Human / Mouse (ortholog); Top expressed in: skin of thigh; tibia; germinal epithelium; buccal mucosa cell; parietal pleura; visceral pleura; ganglionic eminence; amniotic fluid; skin of hip; palpebral conjunctiva / Top expressed in: Rostral migratory stream; zygote; secondary oocyte; medial ganglionic eminence; primary oocyte; maxillary prominence; medullary collecting duct; ventricular zone; mandibular prominence; vas deferens; More reference expression data
BioGPS	n/a
Gene ontology
Molecular function	zinc ion binding; metal ion binding; methylated histone binding
Cellular component	nucleus
Biological process	regulation of transcription, DNA-templated; transcription, DNA-templated; embryonic skeletal system development; chromatin organization
Sources:Amigo / QuickGO
Orthologs
Databases	NCBI: entry; OMA: entry
Species	Human	Mouse
Entrez	54799	103537
Ensembl	ENSG00000011258	ENSMUSG00000059474
UniProt	Q05BQ5	Q6P5G3
RefSeq (mRNA)	NM_017643	NM_134012; NM_001346525; NM_001363336
RefSeq (protein)	NP_060113	NP_001333454; NP_598773; NP_001350265
Location (UCSC)	Chr 17: 51.18 – 51.26 Mb	Chr 11: 93.78 – 93.84 Mb
PubMed search
- Wikidata
View/Edit Human	View/Edit Mouse

Malignant Brain Tumor domain containing 1 is a protein that in humans is encoded by the MBTD1 gene. The gene is also known as SA49P01.
