= GLOD4 =

Enzyme

Available structures
PDB	Ortholog search: PDBe RCSB
PDB	List of PDB id codes 3ZI1

Identifiers
- Aliases: GLOD4, C17orf25, HC71, CGI-150, glyoxalase domain containing 4
- External IDs: MGI: 1914451; HomoloGene: 9376; GeneCards: GLOD4; OMA:GLOD4 - orthologs

Gene location (Human)
Chr.	Chromosome 17 (human)
Band	17p13.3	Start	757,097 bp
Band	17p13.3	End	783,390 bp

Gene location (Mouse)
Chr.	Chromosome 11 (mouse)
Band	11|11 B5	Start	76,011,813 bp
Band	11|11 B5	End	76,134,551 bp
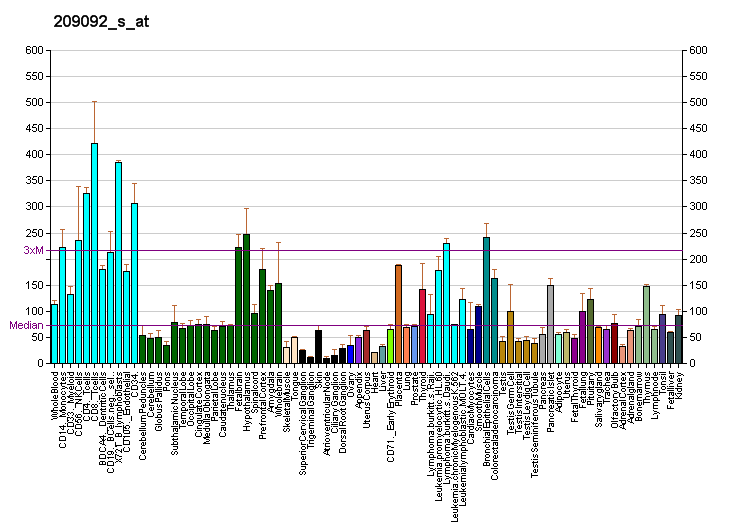
RNA expression pattern
Bgee	Human / Mouse (ortholog); Top expressed in: buccal mucosa cell; ventricular zone; duodenum; islet of Langerhans; rectum; ganglionic eminence; epithelium of nasopharynx; mucosa of transverse colon; palpebral conjunctiva; prefrontal cortex / Top expressed in: endocardial cushion; Paneth cell; medial ganglionic eminence; sciatic nerve; medullary collecting duct; atrioventricular junction; renal corpuscle; atrioventricular valve; ventricular zone; urothelium; More reference expression data
BioGPS	More reference expression data
Gene ontology
Molecular function	cadherin binding
Cellular component	extracellular exosome; mitochondrion
Biological process	cell-cell adhesion
Sources:Amigo / QuickGO
Orthologs
Species	Human	Mouse
Entrez	51031	67201
Ensembl	ENSG00000167699	ENSMUSG00000017286
UniProt	Q9HC38	Q9CPV4
RefSeq (mRNA)	NM_016080; NM_001366247; NM_001366248; NM_001366249; NM_001366250	NM_026029; NM_001362901
RefSeq (protein)	NP_057164; NP_001353176; NP_001353177; NP_001353178; NP_001353179	NP_080305; NP_001349830
Location (UCSC)	Chr 17: 0.76 – 0.78 Mb	Chr 11: 76.01 – 76.13 Mb
PubMed search
- Wikidata
View/Edit Human	View/Edit Mouse

Glyoxalase domain-containing protein 4 is an enzyme that in humans is encoded by the GLOD4 gene.
