= OR1E3 =

Protein-coding gene in the species Homo sapiens

Identifiers
- Aliases: OR1E3, OR17-210, OR1E3P, olfactory receptor family 1 subfamily E member 3 (gene/pseudogene), olfactory receptor family 1 subfamily E member 3
- External IDs: GeneCards: OR1E3

Gene location (Human)
Chr.	Chromosome 17 (human)
Band	17p13.3	Start	3,116,427 bp
Band	17p13.3	End	3,117,374 bp
Gene ontology
Molecular function	G protein-coupled receptor activity; olfactory receptor activity; transmembrane signaling receptor activity; signal transducer activity
Cellular component	integral component of membrane; plasma membrane; membrane
Biological process	G protein-coupled receptor signaling pathway; sensory perception of smell; detection of chemical stimulus involved in sensory perception of smell; detection of chemical stimulus involved in sensory perception; signal transduction; response to stimulus
Sources:Amigo / QuickGO
Orthologs
Databases	NCBI: entry; OMA: entry
Species	Human	Mouse
Entrez	8389	n/a
Ensembl	ENSG00000142163	n/a
UniProt	Q8WZA6; Q9UM77	n/a
RefSeq (mRNA)	NM_001348201	n/a
RefSeq (protein)	NP_001335130	n/a
Location (UCSC)	Chr 17: 3.12 – 3.12 Mb	n/a
PubMed search		n/a
- Wikidata
View/Edit Human

Olfactory receptor family 1 subfamily E member 3 (gene/pseudogene) is a protein that in humans is encoded by the OR1E3 gene.

== Function ==
Olfactory receptors interact with odorant molecules in the nose, to initiate a neuronal response that triggers the perception of a smell. The olfactory receptor proteins are members of a large family of G-protein-coupled receptors (GPCR) arising from single coding-exon genes. Olfactory receptors share a 7-transmembrane domain structure with many neurotransmitter and hormone receptors and are responsible for the recognition and G protein-mediated transduction of odorant signals. The olfactory receptor gene family is the largest in the genome. The nomenclature assigned to the olfactory receptor genes and proteins for this organism is independent of other organisms. [provided by RefSeq, Jul 2008].

== Odorant repertoire ==
Ketones, in particular acetophenone, act as agonists for OR1E3.

From associations to other olfactory receptors, OR1E3 was found to be associated with the odor tendencies "medicine", "phenol", and "harsh".
