= TNFSF12-TNFSF13 =

Protein-coding gene in the species Homo sapiens

Available structures
PDB	Human UniProt search: PDBe RCSB
PDB	List of PDB id codes 4HT1

Identifiers
- Aliases: TNFSF12-TNFSF13, TWE-PRIL, TNFSF12-TNFSF13 readthrough
- External IDs: MGI: 3845075; HomoloGene: 123930; GeneCards: TNFSF12-TNFSF13; OMA:TNFSF12-TNFSF13 - orthologs

Gene location (Human)
Chr.	Chromosome 17 (human)
Band	17p13.1	Start	7,549,099 bp
Band	17p13.1	End	7,561,601 bp

Gene location (Mouse)
Chr.	Chromosome 11 (mouse)
Band	11|11 B3	Start	69,573,403 bp
Band	11|11 B3	End	69,586,924 bp
RNA expression pattern
Bgee	Human / Mouse (ortholog); Top expressed in: olfactory zone of nasal mucosa; granulocyte; blood; stromal cell of endometrium; monocyte; gastric mucosa; subcutaneous adipose tissue; right coronary artery; renal cortex; thoracic aorta / Top expressed in: neural layer of retina; lung; ovary; quadriceps femoris muscle; duodenum; muscle tissue; adrenal gland; bone marrow; right kidney; muscle of thigh; More reference expression data
BioGPS	n/a
Gene ontology
Molecular function	cytokine activity; protein binding; tumor necrosis factor receptor binding; signaling receptor binding
Cellular component	integral component of membrane; membrane; plasma membrane; integral component of plasma membrane; extracellular region; perinuclear region of cytoplasm; extracellular space
Biological process	cell differentiation; positive regulation of endothelial cell proliferation; positive regulation of protein catabolic process; extrinsic apoptotic signaling pathway; tumor necrosis factor-mediated signaling pathway; positive regulation of angiogenesis; multicellular organism development; angiogenesis; immune response; apoptotic signaling pathway; positive regulation of extrinsic apoptotic signaling pathway; endothelial cell migration; signal transduction; apoptotic process; regulation of signaling receptor activity
Sources:Amigo / QuickGO
Orthologs
Species	Human	Mouse
Entrez	407977	619441
Ensembl	ENSG00000248871	ENSMUSG00000018752
UniProt	O43508	n/a
RefSeq (mRNA)	NM_172089	NM_001034097; NM_001034098; NM_001159503
RefSeq (protein)	NP_003800	n/a
Location (UCSC)	Chr 17: 7.55 – 7.56 Mb	Chr 11: 69.57 – 69.59 Mb
PubMed search
- Wikidata
View/Edit Human	View/Edit Mouse

Tumor necrosis factor (ligand) superfamily, member 12-member 13, also known as TNFSF12-TNFSF13, is a human gene.

This gene belongs to the tumor necrosis factor superfamily (TNFSF). It encodes a hybrid protein composed of the cytoplasmic and transmembrane domains of the family member 12 fused to the C-terminal domain of the family member 13. The hybrid protein is membrane anchored and presents the receptor-binding domain of the family member 13 at the cell surface. It stimulates cycling in T-lymphoma and B-lymphoma cell lines. The mRNA transcript is expressed and translated in primary T cells and monocytes.
