= VCF1 =

Protein-coding gene in the species Homo sapiens

FAM104A

Identifiers
- Aliases: FAM104A, family with sequence similarity 104 member A
- External IDs: MGI: 106351; HomoloGene: 13135; GeneCards: FAM104A; OMA:FAM104A - orthologs

Gene location (Human)
Chr.	Chromosome 17 (human)
Band	17q25.1	Start	73,207,353 bp
Band	17q25.1	End	73,236,753 bp

Gene location (Mouse)
Chr.	Chromosome 11 (mouse)
Band	11 E2|11 79.12 cM	Start	113,552,145 bp
Band	11 E2|11 79.12 cM	End	113,574,981 bp
RNA expression pattern
Bgee	Human / Mouse (ortholog); Top expressed in: sperm; left testis; right testis; pancreatic epithelial cell; pancreatic ductal cell; trabecular bone; mucosa of ileum; blood; bone marrow; skin of arm / Top expressed in: zygote; retinal pigment epithelium; blood; Rostral migratory stream; substantia nigra; vestibular membrane of cochlear duct; ciliary body; internal carotid artery; endocardial cushion; external carotid artery; More reference expression data
BioGPS	n/a
Orthologs
Species	Human	Mouse
Entrez	84923	28081
Ensembl	ENSG00000133193	ENSMUSG00000041629
UniProt	Q969W3	n/a
RefSeq (mRNA)	NM_001098832; NM_001289410; NM_001289411; NM_001289412; NM_032837	NM_138598; NM_001362751
RefSeq (protein)	NP_001092302; NP_001276339; NP_001276340; NP_001276341; NP_116226	n/a
Location (UCSC)	Chr 17: 73.21 – 73.24 Mb	Chr 11: 113.55 – 113.57 Mb
PubMed search
- Wikidata
View/Edit Human	View/Edit Mouse

Protein VCF1 is a protein that in humans is encoded by the VCF1 gene. The orthologous gene in mice is also known as D11Wsu99e.
