= WFDC21P =

Pseudogene in the species Homo sapiens

Identifiers
- Aliases: WFDC21P, LNCDC, lnc-DC, linc-DC, WAP four-disulfide core domain 21, pseudogene
- External IDs: OMIM: 615772; GeneCards: WFDC21P; OMA:WFDC21P - orthologs

Gene location (Human)
Chr.	Chromosome 17 (human)
Band	17q23.1	Start	60,083,562 bp
Band	17q23.1	End	60,091,885 bp
RNA expression pattern
Bgee	Human / Mouse (ortholog); Top expressed in: nasal epithelium; olfactory zone of nasal mucosa; skin of leg; skin of abdomen; skin of arm; buccal mucosa cell; minor salivary glands; oral cavity; testicle; bronchial epithelial cell / n/a; More reference expression data
BioGPS	n/a
Orthologs
Species	Human	Mouse
Entrez	645638	n/a
Ensembl	ENSG00000261040	n/a
UniProt	n a	n/a
RefSeq (mRNA)	n/a	n/a
RefSeq (protein)	n/a	n/a
Location (UCSC)	Chr 17: 60.08 – 60.09 Mb	n/a
PubMed search		n/a
- Wikidata
View/Edit Human

WAP four-disulfide core domain 21, pseudogene is a protein that is encoded by the WFDC21P gene in humans.
