= SLFN14 =

Protein-coding gene in the species Homo sapiens

Identifiers
- Aliases: SLFN14, BDPLT20, schlafen family member 14
- External IDs: OMIM: 614958; MGI: 2684866; HomoloGene: 19082; GeneCards: SLFN14; OMA:SLFN14 - orthologs

Gene location (Human)
Chr.	Chromosome 17 (human)
Band	17q12	Start	35,543,985 bp
Band	17q12	End	35,560,819 bp

Gene location (Mouse)
Chr.	Chromosome 11 (mouse)
Band	11|11 C	Start	83,165,936 bp
Band	11|11 C	End	83,177,552 bp
RNA expression pattern
Bgee	Human / Mouse (ortholog); Top expressed in: monocyte; bone marrow cell; blood; granulocyte; lymph node; spleen; right lung; right uterine tube; appendix; placenta / Top expressed in: bone marrow; spleen; embryo; ovary; genital tubercle; thoracic segment of trunk; heart; stomach; neural tube; liver; More reference expression data
BioGPS	n/a
Gene ontology
Molecular function	ribosome binding; ATP binding; endoribonuclease activity; nuclease activity; hydrolase activity; endonuclease activity; nucleotide binding
Cellular component	cytoplasm; nucleus
Biological process	rRNA catabolic process; cellular response to magnesium ion; cellular response to manganese ion; mRNA catabolic process; RNA phosphodiester bond hydrolysis, endonucleolytic; platelet maturation
Sources:Amigo / QuickGO
Orthologs
Species	Human	Mouse
Entrez	342618	237890
Ensembl	ENSG00000236320	ENSMUSG00000082101
UniProt	P0C7P3	V9GXG1
RefSeq (mRNA)	NM_001129820	NM_001166028
RefSeq (protein)	NP_001123292	NP_001159500
Location (UCSC)	Chr 17: 35.54 – 35.56 Mb	Chr 11: 83.17 – 83.18 Mb
PubMed search
- Wikidata
View/Edit Human	View/Edit Mouse

Schlafen family member 14 is a protein that in humans is encoded by the SLFN14 gene.

== Function ==
The protein encoded by this gene plays an important role in platelet formation and function. Defects in this gene are a cause of thrombocytopenia with excessive bleeding. [provided by RefSeq, Jul 2016].
