= C-C motif chemokine ligand 3 like 3 =

Protein-coding gene in humans

CCL3L3

Identifiers
- Aliases: CCL3L3, 464.2, D17S1718, G0S19-2, LD78, LD78BETA, SCYA3L, SCYA3L1, C-C motif chemokine ligand 3 like 3
- External IDs: OMIM: 609468; MGI: 98260; GeneCards: CCL3L3

Gene location (Human)
Chr.	Chromosome 17 (human)
Band	17q12	Start	36,194,869 bp
Band	17q12	End	36,196,758 bp

Gene location (Mouse)
Chr.	Chromosome 11 (mouse)
Band	11 C|11 51.04 cM	Start	83,538,670 bp
Band	11 C|11 51.04 cM	End	83,540,181 bp
RNA expression pattern
Bgee	Human / Mouse (ortholog); Top expressed in: bone marrow; monocyte; bone marrow cell; testicle; gonad; lymph node; appendix; blood; granulocyte; spleen / Top expressed in: granulocyte; stroma of bone marrow; calvaria; spermatid; blood; dermis; secondary oocyte; thymus; islet of Langerhans; right kidney; More reference expression data
BioGPS	n/a
Gene ontology
Molecular function	chemokine activity; cytokine activity; CCR chemokine receptor binding
Cellular component	extracellular region; extracellular space
Biological process	lymphocyte chemotaxis; chemokine-mediated signaling pathway; G protein-coupled receptor signaling pathway; positive regulation of GTPase activity; cellular response to tumor necrosis factor; chemotaxis; inflammatory response; cellular response to interleukin-1; monocyte chemotaxis; neutrophil chemotaxis; negative regulation of cell population proliferation; positive regulation of ERK1 and ERK2 cascade; immune response; cellular response to interferon-gamma; regulation of signaling receptor activity; cytokine-mediated signaling pathway; positive regulation of inflammatory response
Sources:Amigo / QuickGO
Orthologs
Databases	NCBI: entry; OMA: entry
Species	Human	Mouse
Entrez	414062	20302
Ensembl	ENSG00000276085	ENSMUSG00000000982
UniProt	P16619	P10855
RefSeq (mRNA)	NM_001001437	NM_011337
RefSeq (protein)	NP_001001437; NP_066286	NP_035467
Location (UCSC)	Chr 17: 36.19 – 36.2 Mb	Chr 11: 83.54 – 83.54 Mb
PubMed search
- Wikidata
View/Edit Human	View/Edit Mouse

C-C motif chemokine ligand 3 like 3 is a protein that in humans is encoded by the CCL3L3 gene.

== Function ==
This gene is one of several cytokine genes that are clustered on the q-arm of chromosome 17. Cytokines are a family of secreted proteins that function in inflammatory and immunoregulatory processes. The protein encoded by this gene binds to several chemokine receptors, including chemokine binding protein 2 and chemokine (C-C motif) receptor 5 (CCR5). CCR5 is a co-receptor for HIV, and binding of this protein to CCR5 inhibits HIV entry. The copy number of this gene varies among individuals, where most individuals have one to six copies, and a minority of individuals have zero or more than six copies. There are conflicting reports about copy number variation of this gene and its correlation to disease susceptibility.
