= OR1D5 =

Protein-coding gene in humans

Identifiers
- Aliases: OR1D5, C17orf2, OR17-2, OR17-30, OR17-31, OR1D4, olfactory receptor family 1 subfamily D member 5
- External IDs: GeneCards: OR1D5

Gene location (Human)
Chr.	Chromosome 17 (human)
Band	17p13.3	Start	3,062,669 bp
Band	17p13.3	End	3,063,607 bp
RNA expression pattern
Bgee	Human / Mouse (ortholog); Top expressed in: testicle / n/a; More reference expression data
BioGPS	n/a
Gene ontology
Molecular function	signal transducer activity; G protein-coupled receptor activity; olfactory receptor activity
Cellular component	plasma membrane; membrane; integral component of membrane
Biological process	sensory perception of smell; signal transduction; response to stimulus; G protein-coupled receptor signaling pathway; detection of chemical stimulus involved in sensory perception of smell
Sources:Amigo / QuickGO
Orthologs
Databases	NCBI: entry; OMA: entry
Species	Human	Mouse
Entrez	8386	n/a
Ensembl	ENSG00000262628	n/a
UniProt	P58170	n/a
RefSeq (mRNA)	NM_014566	n/a
RefSeq (protein)	NP_055381	n/a
Location (UCSC)	Chr 17: 3.06 – 3.06 Mb	n/a
PubMed search		n/a
- Wikidata
View/Edit Human

Olfactory receptor 1D5 is a protein that in humans is encoded by the OR1D5 gene. Olfactory receptors interact with odorant molecules in the nose, to initiate a neuronal response that triggers the perception of a smell. The olfactory receptor proteins are members of a large family of G-protein-coupled receptors (GPCR) arising from single coding-exon genes. Olfactory receptors share a 7-transmembrane domain structure with many neurotransmitter and hormone receptors and are responsible for the recognition and G protein-mediated transduction of odorant signals. The olfactory receptor gene family is the largest in the genome. The nomenclature assigned to the olfactory receptor genes and proteins for this organism is independent of other organisms.
