= MIR1250 =

Non-coding RNA in the species Homo sapiens

Identifiers
- Aliases: MIR1250, MIRN1250, hsa-mir-1250, mir-1250, microRNA 1250
- External IDs: GeneCards: MIR1250; OMA:MIR1250 - orthologs

Gene location (Human)
Chr.	Chromosome 17 (human)
Band	17q25.3	Start	81,133,196 bp
Band	17q25.3	End	81,133,308 bp
RNA expression pattern
Bgee	Human / Mouse (ortholog); Top expressed in: right hemisphere of cerebellum; blood; pituitary gland; body of pancreas; anterior pituitary; olfactory zone of nasal mucosa; right frontal lobe; prefrontal cortex; Brodmann area 9; granulocyte / n/a; More reference expression data
BioGPS	n/a
Orthologs
Species	Human	Mouse
Entrez	100302229	n/a
Ensembl	ENSG00000221025	n/a
UniProt	n a	n/a
RefSeq (mRNA)	n/a	n/a
RefSeq (protein)	n/a	n/a
Location (UCSC)	Chr 17: 81.13 – 81.13 Mb	n/a
PubMed search		n/a
- Wikidata
View/Edit Human

MicroRNA 1250 is a protein that in humans is encoded by the MIR1250 gene.

== Function ==
microRNAs (miRNAs) are short (20-24 nt) non-coding RNAs that are involved in post-transcriptional regulation of gene expression in multicellular organisms by affecting both the stability and translation of mRNAs. miRNAs are transcribed by RNA polymerase II as part of capped and polyadenylated primary transcripts (pri-miRNAs) that can be either protein-coding or non-coding. The primary transcript is cleaved by the Drosha ribonuclease III enzyme to produce an approximately 70-nt stem-loop precursor miRNA (pre-miRNA), which is further cleaved by the cytoplasmic Dicer ribonuclease to generate the mature miRNA and antisense miRNA star (miRNA*) products. The mature miRNA is incorporated into a RNA-induced silencing complex (RISC), which recognizes target mRNAs through imperfect base pairing with the miRNA and most commonly results in translational inhibition or destabilization of the target mRNA. The RefSeq represents the predicted microRNA stem-loop. [provided by RefSeq, Sep 2009].
