= RAB34 =

Protein-coding gene in the species Homo sapiens

Identifiers
- Aliases: RAB34, RAB39, RAH, member RAS oncogene family, NARR
- External IDs: OMIM: 610917; MGI: 104606; GeneCards: RAB34
Enzyme activity
| EC # | BRENDA | ExPASy | KEGG | MetaCyc |
|---|---|---|---|---|
| 3.6.5.2 | ↗ | ↗ | ↗ | ↗ |

Gene location (Human)
| Chr. | Chromosome 17 (human) |
| Band | 17q11.2 | Start | 28,714,281 bp |
| Band | 17q11.2 | End | 28,718,429 bp |

Gene location (Mouse)
| Chr. | Chromosome 11 (mouse) |
| Band | 11 B5|11 46.74 cM | Start | 78,079,256 bp |
| Band | 11 B5|11 46.74 cM | End | 78,083,019 bp |
RNA expression pattern
| Bgee | Human / Mouse (ortholog); Top expressed in: Descending thoracic aorta; left ovary; right ovary; stromal cell of endometrium; canal of the cervix; ascending aorta; gastric mucosa; body of uterus; right coronary artery; left uterine tube / Top expressed in: calvaria; internal carotid artery; vas deferens; external carotid artery; condyle; brown adipose tissue; tunica adventitia of aorta; fossa; iris; molar; More reference expression data |
| BioGPS | n/a |
Gene ontology
| Molecular function | nucleotide binding; GTP binding; protein binding; GTP-dependent protein binding; GTPase activity |
| Cellular component | cytoplasm; vesicle; phagocytic vesicle membrane; Golgi apparatus; membrane; Golgi cisterna; ruffle membrane; phagocytic vesicle; perinuclear region of cytoplasm; Golgi stack; extracellular exosome; cytoplasmic vesicle; cilium; cell projection; nucleus; nucleolus |
| Biological process | antigen processing and presentation; phagosome-lysosome fusion; phagosome maturation; lysosome localization; macropinocytosis; protein transport; protein localization to plasma membrane; Golgi to plasma membrane protein transport; transport; intracellular protein transport; cell projection organization; Rab protein signal transduction; positive regulation of smoothened signaling pathway; endocytosis |
Sources:Amigo / QuickGO
Orthologs
| Databases | NCBI: entry; OMA: entry |
| Species | Human | Mouse |
| Entrez | 83871 | 19376 |
| Ensembl | ENSG00000109113 | ENSMUSG00000002059 |
| UniProt | Q9BZG1; P0DI83 | Q64008 |
| RefSeq (mRNA) | NM_001142624; NM_001142625; NM_001144942; NM_001144943; NM_001256276 NM_001256277; NM_001256278; NM_001256281; NM_031934 | NM_001159482; NM_033475 |
| RefSeq (protein) | NP_001136096; NP_001136097; NP_001138414; NP_001138415; NP_001243205 NP_001243206; NP_001243207; NP_001243210; NP_114140; NP_001243210.1 | NP_001152954; NP_258436 |
| Location (UCSC) | Chr 17: 28.71 – 28.72 Mb | Chr 11: 78.08 – 78.08 Mb |
| PubMed search |
- Wikidata
| View/Edit Human | View/Edit Mouse |

Ras-related protein Rab-34 is a protein that in humans is encoded by the RAB34 gene.
