= ZNF830 =

Protein-coding gene in the species Homo sapiens

Identifiers
- Aliases: ZNF830, CCDC16, OMCG1, zinc finger protein 830
- External IDs: MGI: 1914233; GeneCards: ZNF830

Gene location (Human)
Chr.	Chromosome 17 (human)
Band	17q12	Start	34,961,540 bp
Band	17q12	End	34,963,777 bp

Gene location (Mouse)
Chr.	Chromosome 11 (mouse)
Band	11|11 C	Start	82,655,171 bp
Band	11|11 C	End	82,656,761 bp
RNA expression pattern
Bgee	Human / Mouse (ortholog); Top expressed in: tendon of biceps brachii; pancreatic epithelial cell; skin of arm; myocardium of left ventricle; cardiac muscle tissue of right atrium; epithelium of nasopharynx; parotid gland; thymus; internal globus pallidus; germinal epithelium / Top expressed in: otic vesicle; otic placode; saccule; zygote; secondary oocyte; proximal tubule; seminiferous tubule; primary oocyte; right kidney; maxillary prominence; More reference expression data
BioGPS	n/a
Gene ontology
Molecular function	protein binding; metal ion binding; zinc ion binding; nucleic acid binding
Cellular component	nuclear speck; chromosome; nucleus; nucleoplasm; spliceosomal complex
Biological process	blastocyst growth; chromosome organization; intestinal epithelial structure maintenance; multicellular organism development; transcription-coupled nucleotide-excision repair; nuclear DNA replication; mitotic DNA damage checkpoint signaling; cell division; cell cycle; mitotic DNA replication checkpoint signaling; preantral ovarian follicle growth; replication fork protection; ovarian follicle development; negative regulation of apoptotic process; mitotic cell cycle; mRNA processing; RNA splicing
Sources:Amigo / QuickGO
Orthologs
Databases	NCBI: entry; OMA: entry
Species	Human	Mouse
Entrez	91603	66983
Ensembl	ENSG00000198783	ENSMUSG00000046010
UniProt	Q96NB3	Q8R1N0
RefSeq (mRNA)	NM_052857	NM_025884
RefSeq (protein)	NP_443089	NP_080160
Location (UCSC)	Chr 17: 34.96 – 34.96 Mb	Chr 11: 82.66 – 82.66 Mb
PubMed search
- Wikidata
View/Edit Human	View/Edit Mouse

Zinc finger protein 830 is a protein that in humans is encoded by the ZNF830 gene.
