= CLUH =

Protein-coding gene in humans

Identifiers
- Aliases: CLUH, CLU1, KIAA0664, clustered mitochondria (cluA/CLU1) homolog, clustered mitochondria homolog
- External IDs: OMIM: 616184; MGI: 1921398; HomoloGene: 9063; GeneCards: CLUH; OMA:CLUH - orthologs

Gene location (Human)
Chr.	Chromosome 17 (human)
Band	17p13.3	Start	2,689,386 bp
Band	17p13.3	End	2,712,663 bp

Gene location (Mouse)
Chr.	Chromosome 11 (mouse)
Band	11 B5|11	Start	74,540,321 bp
Band	11 B5|11	End	74,561,673 bp
RNA expression pattern
Bgee	Human / Mouse (ortholog); Top expressed in: gingival epithelium; apex of heart; right lobe of liver; mucosa of transverse colon; gastrocnemius muscle; muscle of thigh; left ventricle; left adrenal cortex; right adrenal gland; right adrenal cortex / Top expressed in: interventricular septum; brown adipose tissue; crypt of lieberkuhn of small intestine; myocardium of ventricle; muscle of thigh; left lobe of liver; cardiac muscles; right ventricle; skeletal muscle tissue; soleus muscle; More reference expression data
BioGPS	n/a
Gene ontology
Molecular function	mRNA binding; RNA binding
Cellular component	cytoplasm
Biological process	intracellular distribution of mitochondria; mitochondrion organization
Sources:Amigo / QuickGO
Orthologs
Species	Human	Mouse
Entrez	23277	74148
Ensembl	ENSG00000132361	ENSMUSG00000020741
UniProt	O75153	Q5SW19
RefSeq (mRNA)	NM_015229	NM_001081158; NM_001368711
RefSeq (protein)	NP_056044; NP_001353590; NP_001353591	NP_001074627; NP_001355640
Location (UCSC)	Chr 17: 2.69 – 2.71 Mb	Chr 11: 74.54 – 74.56 Mb
PubMed search
- Wikidata
View/Edit Human	View/Edit Mouse

Clustered mitochondria (cluA/CLU1) homolog is a protein in humans that is encoded by the CLUH gene.
