= Proline rich 11 =

Protein-coding gene in the species Homo sapiens

PRR11

Identifiers
- Aliases: PRR11, proline rich 11
- External IDs: OMIM: 615920; MGI: 2444496; HomoloGene: 10123; GeneCards: PRR11; OMA:PRR11 - orthologs

Gene location (Human)
Chr.	Chromosome 17 (human)
Band	17q22	Start	59,155,732 bp
Band	17q22	End	59,206,709 bp

Gene location (Mouse)
Chr.	Chromosome 11 (mouse)
Band	11|11 C	Start	86,979,979 bp
Band	11|11 C	End	86,999,534 bp
RNA expression pattern
Bgee	Human / Mouse (ortholog); Top expressed in: endothelial cell; renal medulla; cardia; pylorus; nipple; superior surface of tongue; ventral tegmental area; buccal mucosa cell; trigeminal ganglion; inferior ganglion of vagus nerve / Top expressed in: tail of embryo; genital tubercle; ventricular zone; hand; epiblast; cumulus cell; granulocyte; primitive streak; morula; thymus; More reference expression data
BioGPS	n/a
Orthologs
Species	Human	Mouse
Entrez	55771	270906
Ensembl	ENSG00000068489	ENSMUSG00000020493
UniProt	Q96HE9	Q8BHE0
RefSeq (mRNA)	NM_018304	NM_175563
RefSeq (protein)	NP_060774; NP_060774.2	NP_780772
Location (UCSC)	Chr 17: 59.16 – 59.21 Mb	Chr 11: 86.98 – 87 Mb
PubMed search
- Wikidata
View/Edit Human	View/Edit Mouse

Proline rich 11 is a protein that in humans is encoded by the PRR11 gene.
