= MLLT6 =

Protein-coding gene in the species Homo sapiens

Identifiers
- Aliases: MLLT6, AF17, myeloid/lymphoid or mixed-lineage leukemia; translocated to, 6, PHD finger containing
- External IDs: OMIM: 600328; MGI: 1935145; GeneCards: MLLT6

Gene location (Human)
Chr.	Chromosome 17 (human)
Band	17q12	Start	38,705,273 bp
Band	17q12	End	38,729,795 bp

Gene location (Mouse)
Chr.	Chromosome 11 (mouse)
Band	11 D|11 61.05 cM	Start	97,554,240 bp
Band	11 D|11 61.05 cM	End	97,576,289 bp
RNA expression pattern
Bgee	Human / Mouse (ortholog); Top expressed in: right uterine tube; pituitary gland; left ovary; right lobe of thyroid gland; right ovary; granulocyte; sural nerve; anterior pituitary; left lobe of thyroid gland; appendix / Top expressed in: neural layer of retina; ciliary body; mesenteric lymph nodes; retinal pigment epithelium; vestibular membrane of cochlear duct; dorsal striatum; Region I of hippocampus proper; olfactory tubercle; habenula; superior colliculus; More reference expression data
BioGPS	n/a
Gene ontology
Molecular function	metal ion binding; protein binding; nucleosome binding; histone binding
Cellular component	nucleus
Biological process	regulation of transcription, DNA-templated; renal system process; excretion; positive regulation of sodium ion transport; negative regulation of urine volume; renal sodium excretion; renal potassium excretion; positive regulation of transcription by RNA polymerase II; negative regulation of histone H3-K79 methylation
Sources:Amigo / QuickGO
Orthologs
Databases	NCBI: entry; OMA: entry
Species	Human	Mouse
Entrez	4302	246198
Ensembl	ENSG00000275023; ENSG00000275851	ENSMUSG00000038437
UniProt	P55198; Q6P2C6	n/a
RefSeq (mRNA)	NM_005937	NM_139311
RefSeq (protein)	NP_005928	n/a
Location (UCSC)	Chr 17: 38.71 – 38.73 Mb	Chr 11: 97.55 – 97.58 Mb
PubMed search
- Wikidata
View/Edit Human	View/Edit Mouse

MLLT6, PHD finger containing is a protein that in humans is encoded by the MLLT6 gene.

== See also ==
- PHD finger
