= Vascular endothelial zinc finger 1 =

Protein-coding gene in the species Homo sapiens

VEZF1

Identifiers
- Aliases: VEZF1, DB1, ZNF161, vascular endothelial zinc finger 1
- External IDs: OMIM: 606747; MGI: 1313291; GeneCards: VEZF1

Gene location (Human)
Chr.	Chromosome 17 (human)
Band	17q22	Start	57,971,547 bp
Band	17q22	End	57,988,259 bp
RNA expression pattern
Bgee	Human / Mouse (ortholog); Top expressed in: buccal mucosa cell; internal globus pallidus; ventricular zone; bronchial epithelial cell; ganglionic eminence; germinal epithelium; caput epididymis; tail of epididymis; Skeletal muscle tissue of rectus abdominis; Skeletal muscle tissue of biceps brachii / n/a; More reference expression data
BioGPS	n/a
Gene ontology
Molecular function	DNA binding; metal ion binding; nucleic acid binding; RNA polymerase II transcription regulatory region sequence-specific DNA binding; DNA-binding transcription activator activity, RNA polymerase II-specific; DNA-binding transcription factor activity, RNA polymerase II-specific
Cellular component	nucleoplasm; nucleus
Biological process	regulation of transcription by RNA polymerase II; cellular defense response; regulation of transcription, DNA-templated; transcription by RNA polymerase II; endothelial cell development; angiogenesis; transcription, DNA-templated; positive regulation of transcription by RNA polymerase II; positive regulation of endothelial cell differentiation
Sources:Amigo / QuickGO
Orthologs
Databases	NCBI: entry; OMA: entry
Species	Human	Mouse
Entrez	7716	22344
Ensembl	ENSG00000136451	ENSMUSG00000018377
UniProt	Q14119	n/a
RefSeq (mRNA)	NM_007146; NM_001330393	NM_016686
RefSeq (protein)	NP_001317322; NP_009077	n/a
Location (UCSC)	Chr 17: 57.97 – 57.99 Mb	n/a
PubMed search
- Wikidata
View/Edit Human	View/Edit Mouse

Vascular endothelial zinc finger 1 is a protein that in humans is encoded by the VEZF1 gene.

== Function ==
Transcriptional regulatory proteins containing tandemly repeated zinc finger domains are thought to be involved in both normal and abnormal cellular proliferation and differentiation. ZNF161 is a C2H2-type zinc finger protein (Koyano-Nakagawa et al., 1994 [PubMed 8035792]). See MIM 603971 for general information on zinc finger proteins.
