= LINC00511 =

Non-coding RNA in the species Homo sapiens

Identifiers
- Aliases: LINC00511, LCAL5, onco-lncRNA-12, long intergenic non-protein coding RNA 511
- External IDs: GeneCards: LINC00511

Gene location (Human)
Chr.	Chromosome 17 (human)
Band	17q24.3	Start	72,290,091 bp
Band	17q24.3	End	72,640,472 bp
RNA expression pattern
Bgee	Human / Mouse (ortholog); Top expressed in: pancreatic ductal cell; nasal epithelium; olfactory zone of nasal mucosa; sural nerve; mucosa of ileum; islet of Langerhans; cartilage tissue; epithelium of colon; palpebral conjunctiva; mucosa of transverse colon / n/a; More reference expression data
BioGPS	n/a
Orthologs
Databases	NCBI: entry; OMA: entry
Species	Human	Mouse
Entrez	400619	n/a
Ensembl	ENSG00000227036	n/a
UniProt	n a	n/a
RefSeq (mRNA)	n/a	n/a
RefSeq (protein)	n/a	n/a
Location (UCSC)	Chr 17: 72.29 – 72.64 Mb	n/a
PubMed search		n/a
- Wikidata
View/Edit Human

Long intergenic non-protein coding RNA 511 is a long non-coding RNA that in humans is produced by the LINC00511 gene.
