= SLFN5 =

Protein-coding gene in the species Homo sapiens

Identifiers
- Aliases: SLFN5, schlafen family member 5
- External IDs: OMIM: 614952; MGI: 1329004; HomoloGene: 18839; GeneCards: SLFN5; OMA:SLFN5 - orthologs

Gene location (Human)
| Chr. | Chromosome 17 (human) |
| Band | 17q12 | Start | 35,243,071 bp |
| Band | 17q12 | End | 35,273,655 bp |

Gene location (Mouse)
| Chr. | Chromosome 11 (mouse) |
| Band | 11|11 C | Start | 82,842,175 bp |
| Band | 11|11 C | End | 82,855,666 bp |
RNA expression pattern
| Bgee | Human / Mouse (ortholog); Top expressed in: visceral pleura; pancreatic ductal cell; superficial temporal artery; parietal pleura; pylorus; cardia; buccal mucosa cell; nasal epithelium; tendon of biceps brachii; nipple / Top expressed in: muscle of thigh; white adipose tissue; right lung; myocardium of ventricle; esophagus; granulocyte; subcutaneous adipose tissue; soleus muscle; stroma of bone marrow; extraocular muscle; More reference expression data |
| BioGPS | n/a |
Gene ontology
| Molecular function | ATP binding; nucleotide binding |
| Cellular component | nucleus |
| Biological process | cell differentiation |
Sources:Amigo / QuickGO
Orthologs
| Species | Human | Mouse |
| Entrez | 162394 | 327978 |
| Ensembl | ENSG00000166750 | ENSMUSG00000054404 |
| UniProt | Q08AF3 | Q8CBA2 |
| RefSeq (mRNA) | NM_144975; NM_001330183 | NM_183201 |
| RefSeq (protein) | NP_001317112; NP_659412 | NP_899024 |
| Location (UCSC) | Chr 17: 35.24 – 35.27 Mb | Chr 11: 82.84 – 82.86 Mb |
| PubMed search |
- Wikidata
| View/Edit Human | View/Edit Mouse |

Schlafen family member 5 is a protein that in humans is encoded by the SLFN5 gene.
