= Long intergenic non-protein coding RNA 483 =

Non-coding RNA in the species Homo sapiens

LINC00483

Identifiers
- Aliases: LINC00483, C17orf73, long intergenic non-protein coding RNA 483
- External IDs: GeneCards: LINC00483; OMA:LINC00483 - orthologs
Orthologs
Species	Human	Mouse
Entrez	55018	n/a
Ensembl	ENSG00000167117	n/a
UniProt	n a	n/a
RefSeq (mRNA)	NM_017928; NM_001358683	n/a
RefSeq (protein)	n/a	n/a
Location (UCSC)	n/a	n/a
PubMed search		n/a
- Wikidata
View/Edit Human

Long intergenic non-protein coding RNA 483 is a protein that in humans is encoded by the LINC00483 gene.
