= CUE domain containing 1 =

Protein-coding gene in the species Homo sapiens

An Error has occurred retrieving Wikidata item for infobox

CUE domain containing 1 is a protein that in humans is encoded by the CUEDC1 gene.
