= BRCA1P1 =

Pseudogene in the species Homo sapiens

Identifiers
- Aliases: BRCA1P1, LBRCA1, PsiBRCA1, pseudo-BRCA1, BRCA1 pseudogene 1
- External IDs: GeneCards: BRCA1P1; OMA:BRCA1P1 - orthologs
Orthologs
Species	Human	Mouse
Entrez	394269	n/a
Ensembl	n/a	n/a
UniProt	n a	n/a
RefSeq (mRNA)	n/a	n/a
RefSeq (protein)	n/a	n/a
Location (UCSC)	n/a	n/a
PubMed search		n/a
- Wikidata
View/Edit Human

BRCA1 pseudogene 1 is a protein that in humans is encoded by the BRCA1P1 gene.
