= MAPT-AS1 =

Non-coding RNA in the species Homo sapiens

Identifiers
- Aliases: MAPT-AS1, MAPT antisense RNA 1
- External IDs: GeneCards: MAPT-AS1
Orthologs
| Databases | NCBI: entry; OMA: entry |
| Species | Human | Mouse |
| Entrez | 100128977 | n/a |
| Ensembl | ENSG00000264589 | n/a |
| UniProt | n a | n/a |
| RefSeq (mRNA) | n/a | n/a |
| RefSeq (protein) | n/a | n/a |
| Location (UCSC) | n/a | n/a |
| PubMed search | | n/a |
- Wikidata
| View/Edit Human |

MAPT antisense RNA 1 is a noncoding RNA that in humans is encoded by the MAPT-AS1 gene.
