= P53 regulation associated lncRNA =

Non-coding RNA in the species Homo sapiens

PRAL

Identifiers
- Aliases: PRAL, p53 regulation associated lncRNA, lncRNA-PRAL
- External IDs: GeneCards: PRAL; OMA:PRAL - orthologs
Orthologs
Species	Human	Mouse
Entrez	109245082	n/a
Ensembl	ENSG00000279296	n/a
UniProt	n a	n/a
RefSeq (mRNA)	n/a	n/a
RefSeq (protein)	n/a	n/a
Location (UCSC)	n/a	n/a
PubMed search		n/a
- Wikidata
View/Edit Human

P53 regulation associated lncRNA is a protein that in humans is encoded by the PRAL gene.
