= LINC00674 =

Non-coding RNA in the species Homo sapiens

Identifiers
- Aliases: LINC00674, long intergenic non-protein coding RNA 674
- External IDs: GeneCards: LINC00674
Orthologs
Databases	NCBI: entry; OMA: entry
Species	Human	Mouse
Entrez	100499466	n/a
Ensembl	ENSG00000237854	n/a
UniProt	n a	n/a
RefSeq (mRNA)	n/a	n/a
RefSeq (protein)	n/a	n/a
Location (UCSC)	n/a	n/a
PubMed search		n/a
- Wikidata
View/Edit Human

Long intergenic non-protein coding RNA 674 is a long non-coding RNA in humans that is encoded by the LINC00674 gene.
