= CTAA2 =

Genetic element in the species Homo sapiens

Identifiers
- Aliases: CTAA2, cataract, anterior polar 2
- External IDs: GeneCards: CTAA2; OMA:CTAA2 - orthologs
Orthologs
Species	Human	Mouse
Entrez	1484	n/a
Ensembl	n/a	n/a
UniProt	n a	n/a
RefSeq (mRNA)	n/a	n/a
RefSeq (protein)	n/a	n/a
Location (UCSC)	n/a	n/a
PubMed search		n/a
- Wikidata
View/Edit Human

Cataract, anterior polar 2 is a protein that in humans is encoded by the CTAA2 gene.
