= List of keratins =

The first sequences of keratins revealed that keratins could be grouped into two categories based on their sequence homologies. These two groups of keratins were named as type I and type II keratins. These two categories also represent the first two categories of the superfamily of intermediate filament proteins.

Keratins in this table are classified in the first two columns according to the nomenclature established in 2006. Other names previously used are listed in columns 3 and 4.

== Type I keratins ==
=== Human epithelial keratins ===
Protein name	Gene name	Other protein name	Other gene name
K9	KRT9	Ka9	
K10	KRT10	Ka10	
K12	KRT12	Ka12	
K13	KRT13	Ka13	
K14	KRT14	Ka14	
K15	KRT15	Ka15	
K16	KRT16	Ka16	
K17	KRT17	Ka17	
K18	KRT18	Ka18	
K19	KRT19	Ka19	
K20	KRT20	Ka20	
K23	KRT23	Ka23	
K24	KRT24	Ka24	
K25	KRT25	Ka38, K25irs1, K10C, hIRSa1	KRT25A
K26	KRT26	Ka39, K25irs2, K10D	
K27	KRT27	Ka40, K25irs3, K10B, hIRSa3.1	
K28	KRT28	Ka41, K25irs4, hIRSa2	

=== Human hair keratins ===
Protein name	Gene name	Other protein name	Other gene name
K31	KRT31	Ka25, Ha1	KRTHA1
K32	KRT32	Ka26, Ha2	KRTHA2
K33a	KRT33A	Ka27, Ha3-I	KRTHA3A
K33b	KRT33B	Ka28, Ha3-II	KRTHA3B
K34	KRT34	Ka29, Ha4	KRTHA4
K35	KRT35	Ka30, Ha5	KRTHA5
K36	KRT36	Ka31, Ha6	KRTHA6
K37	KRT37	Ka32, Ha7	KRTHA7
K38	KRT38	Ka33, Ha8	KRTHA8
K39	KRT39	Ka35	
K40	KRT40	Ka36	

=== Nonhuman hair/epithelial keratins ===
Protein name	Gene name	Other protein name	Other gene name
K41 chimp, gorilla, dog	KRT41 chimp, gorilla, dog; KRT41P man, horse		φhHaA, Ka34P man
K42 mouse, rat	KRT42 mouse, rat; KRT42P man	Ka22 mouse, rat, K17n mouse, rat	

=== Human keratin pseudogenes ===
Protein name	Gene name	Other protein name	Other gene name
	KRT221P		φhHaB
	KRT222P		φKRTI, Ka21P
	KRT223P		φKRTJ, Ka37P

== Type II keratins ==
=== Human epithelial keratin ===
Protein name	Gene name	Other protein name	Other gene name
K1	KRT1	Kb1	
K2	KRT2	Kb2, K2e	KRT2A
K3	KRT3	Kb3	
K4	KRT4	Kb4	
K5	KRT5	Kb5	
K6a	KRT6A	Kb6	
K6b	KRT6B	Kb10	
K7	KRT7	Kb7	
K8	KRT8	Kb8	
K71	KRT71	Kb34, K6irs1	
K72	KRT72	Kb35, K6irs2	
K73	KRT73	Kb36, K6irs3	
K74	KRT74	Kb37, K6irs4	
K75	KRT75	Kb18, K6hf	
K76	KRT76	Kb9, K2p	KRT2B
K77	KRT77	Kb39, K1b	
K78	KRT78	Kb40, K5b	
K79	KRT79	Kb38, K6I	
K80	KRT80	Kb20	

=== Human hair keratins ===
Protein name	Gene name	Other protein name	Other gene name
K81	KRT81	Kb21, Hb1, K2.9	KRTHB1
K82	KRT82	Kb22, Hb2	KRTHB2
K83	KRT83	Kb23, Hb3, K2.10	KRTHB3
K84	KRT84	Kb24, Hb4	KRTHB4
K85	KRT85	Kb25, Hb5, K2.12	KRTHB5
K86	KRT86	Kb26, Hb6, K2.11	KRTHB6

=== Human keratin pseudogenes ===
Protein name	Gene name	Other protein name	Other gene name
	KRT121P		φhHbD, Kb31P
	KRT122P		φhHbC, Kb30P
	KRT123P		φhHbB, Kb29P
	KRT124P		φhHbA, Kb28P
	KRT125P		φKRTH
	KRT126P		φKRTG, Kb19P
	KRT127P		φKRTF
	KRT128P		φKRTE

== See also ==
- Keratins
- Skin
- Epidermis
