= Keratin disease =

- Other names: Keratinopathy
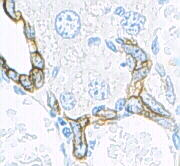
- Keratin (high molecular weight) in bile duct cell and oval cells of mouse liver.
- Specialty: Dermatology

A keratin disease is a genetic disorder of one of the keratin genes. An example is monilethrix. The first to be identified was epidermolysis bullosa simplex.

== Pathology ==
Examples of keratin disease include:

Name	Skin/hair	Keratin
Epidermolysis bullosa simplex	skin	KRT5, KRT14
Epidermolytic hyperkeratosis	skin	KRT1, KRT10
Ichthyosis bullosa of Siemens	skin	KRT2A
Palmoplantar keratoderma	skin	KRT1, KRT9, KRT16
Pachyonychia congenita	skin	KRT6A, KRT6B, KRT16, KRT17
White sponge nevus	skin	KRT4, KRT13
Steatocystoma multiplex	skin	KRT17
Monilethrix	hair	KRT81, KRT83, KRT86
Meesman juvenile epithelial corneal dystrophy	cornea	KRT3, KRT12
Familial cirrhosis	liver	KRT8, KRT18

== See also ==
- List of cutaneous conditions caused by mutations in keratins
