= KRT83 =

Protein-coding gene in Homo sapiens

Identifiers
- Aliases: KRT83, HB3, Hb-3, KRTHB3, keratin 83, MNLIX, EKVP5
- External IDs: OMIM: 602765; MGI: 3690448; GeneCards: KRT83

Gene location (Human)
Chr.	Chromosome 12 (human)
Band	12q13.13	Start	52,314,301 bp
Band	12q13.13	End	52,321,398 bp

Gene location (Mouse)
Chr.	Chromosome 15 (mouse)
Band	15|15 F2	Start	101,383,011 bp
Band	15|15 F2	End	101,389,393 bp
RNA expression pattern
Bgee	Human / Mouse (ortholog); Top expressed in: testicle; hair follicle; nipple; prefrontal cortex; spinal cord; C1 segment; mesencephalon; substantia nigra; superior frontal gyrus; primary visual cortex / Top expressed in: lip; granulocyte; hair follicle; ankle joint; skin of back; skin of abdomen; skin of external ear; dermis; cervix; sexually immature organism; More reference expression data
BioGPS	n/a
Gene ontology
Molecular function	protein binding; structural molecule activity
Cellular component	keratin filament; intermediate filament; extracellular space; cytosol
Biological process	hair cycle; ageing; epidermis development; keratinization; cornification
Sources:Amigo / QuickGO
Orthologs
Databases	NCBI: entry; OMA: entry
Species	Human	Mouse
Entrez	3889	100126226
Ensembl	ENSG00000170523	ENSMUSG00000067613
UniProt	P78385	E9Q1Y9
RefSeq (mRNA)	NM_002282	NM_001201323
RefSeq (protein)	NP_002273	NP_001188252
Location (UCSC)	Chr 12: 52.31 – 52.32 Mb	Chr 15: 101.38 – 101.39 Mb
PubMed search
- Wikidata
View/Edit Human	View/Edit Mouse

Keratin 83, also known as KRT83, is a protein which humans is encoded by the KRT83 gene.

== Function ==
The protein encoded by this gene is a member of the keratin gene family. As a type II hair keratin, it is a basic protein which heterodimerizes with type I keratins to form hair and nails. The type II hair keratins are clustered in a region of chromosome 12q13 and are grouped into two distinct subfamilies based on structure similarity. One subfamily, consisting of KRTHB1 (KRT81), KRTHB3 (KRT83, this protein), and KRTHB6 (KRT86), is highly related. The other less-related subfamily includes KRTHB2 (KRT82), KRTHB4 (KRT84), and KRTHB5 (KRT85). All hair keratins are expressed in the hair follicle; this hair keratin, as well as KRTHB1 and KRTHB6, is found primarily in the hair cortex.

== Clinical significance ==
Mutations in the KRT83 gene have been associated with monilethrix.
