= Alpha-keratin =

Type of keratin found in vertebrates

Alpha-keratin, or α-keratin, is a type of keratin found in mammalian vertebrates. This protein is the primary component in hairs, horns, claws, nails and the epidermis layer of the skin. α-keratin is a fibrous structural protein, meaning it is made up of amino acids that form a repeating secondary structure. The secondary structure of α-keratin is very similar to that of a traditional protein α-helix and forms a coiled coil. Due to its tightly wound structure, it can function as one of the strongest biological materials and has various functions in mammals, from predatory claws to hair for warmth. α-keratin is synthesized through protein biosynthesis, utilizing transcription and translation, but as the cell matures and is full of α-keratin, it dies, creating a strong non-vascular unit of keratinized tissue.

== Structure ==
The molecular structure of alpha-keratin.

Disulfide bonds between two alpha-helix keratin.

α-keratin is a polypeptide chain, typically high in alanine, leucine, arginine, and cysteine, that forms a right-handed α-helix. Two of these polypeptide chains twist together to form a left-handed helical structure known as a coiled coil. These coiled coil dimers, approximately 45 nm long, are bonded together with disulfide bonds, utilizing the many cysteine amino acids found in α-keratins. The dimers then align, their termini bonding with the termini of other dimers, and two of these new chains bond length-wise, all through disulfide bonds, to form a protofilament. Two protofilaments aggregate to form a protofibril, and four protofibrils polymerize to form the intermediate filament (IF). The IF is the basic subunit of α-keratins. These IFs are able to condense into a super-coil formation of about 7 nm in diameter, and can be type I, acidic, or type II, basic. The IFs are finally embedded in a keratin matrix that either is high in cysteine or glycine, tyrosine, and phenylalanine residues. The different types, alignments, and matrices of these IFs account for the large variation in α-keratin structures found in mammals.

== Biochemistry ==
=== Synthesis ===
α-keratin synthesis begins near focal adhesions on the cell membrane. There, the keratin filament precursors go through a process known as nucleation, where the keratin precursors of dimers and filaments elongate, fuse, and bundle together. As this synthesis is occurring, the keratin filament precursors are transported by actin fibers in the cell towards the nucleus. There, the alpha-keratin intermediate filaments will collect and form networks of structure dictated by the use of the keratin cell as the nucleus simultaneously degrades. However, if necessary, instead of continuing to grow, the keratin complex will disassemble into non-filamentous keratin precursors that can diffuse throughout the cell cytoplasm. These keratin filaments will be able to be used in future keratin synthesis, either to re-organize the final structure or create a different keratin complex. When the cell has been filled with the correct keratin and structured correctly, it undergoes keratin stabilization and dies, a form of programmed cell death. This results in a fully matured, non-vascular keratin cell. These fully matured, or cornified, alpha-keratin cells are the main components of hair, the outer layer of nails and horns, and the epidermis layer of the skin.

=== Properties ===
The property of most biological importance of alpha-keratin is its structural stability. When exposed to mechanical stress, α-keratin structures can retain their shape and therefore can protect what they surround. Under high tension, the alpha-helix configuration of alpha-keratin can even change into beta-pleated sheets (not to be confused with beta-keratin, which is a different protein). Alpha-keratin tissues also show signs of viscoelasticity, allowing them to both be able to stretch and absorb impact to a degree, though they are not impervious to fracture. Alpha-keratin strength is also affected by water content in the intermediate filament matrix; higher water content decreases the strength and stiffness of the keratin cell due to its effect on the various hydrogen bonds in the alpha-keratin network.

=== Characterization ===
==== Type I and type II ====
Alpha-keratins proteins can be one of two types: type I or type II. There are 54 keratin genes in humans, 28 of which code for type I, and 26 for type II. Type I proteins are acidic, meaning they contain more acidic amino acids, such as aspartic acid, while type II proteins are basic, meaning they contain more basic amino acids, such as lysine. This differentiation is especially important in alpha-keratins because in the synthesis of its sub-unit dimer, the coiled coil, one protein coil must be type I, while the other must be type II. Even within type I and II, there are acidic and basic keratins that are particularly complementary within each organism. For example, in human skin, K5, a type II alpha keratin, pairs primarily with K14, a type I alpha-keratin, to form the alpha-keratin complex of the epidermis layer of cells in the skin.

==== Hard and soft ====
Hard alpha-keratins, such as those found in nails, have a higher cysteine content in their primary structure. This causes an increase in disulfide bonds that are able to stabilize the keratin structure, allowing it to resist a higher level of force before fracture. On the other hand, soft alpha-keratins, such as ones found in the skin, contain a comparatively smaller amount of disulfide bonds, making their structure more flexible.
