= Keratin 19 =

Protein found in humans

KRT19

Identifiers
- Aliases: KRT19, CK19, K19, K1CS, keratin 19
- External IDs: OMIM: 148020; MGI: 96693; GeneCards: KRT19

Gene location (Human)
Chr.	Chromosome 17 (human)
Band	17q21.2	Start	41,523,617 bp
Band	17q21.2	End	41,528,308 bp

Gene location (Mouse)
Chr.	Chromosome 11 (mouse)
Band	11 D|11 63.42 cM	Start	100,031,636 bp
Band	11 D|11 63.42 cM	End	100,039,491 bp
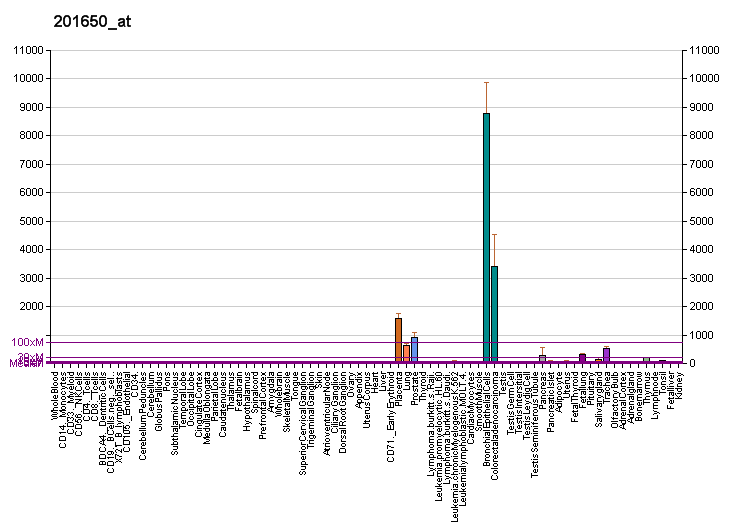
RNA expression pattern
Bgee	Human / Mouse (ortholog); Top expressed in: palpebral conjunctiva; mucosa of transverse colon; nasal epithelium; mucosa of sigmoid colon; olfactory zone of nasal mucosa; amniotic fluid; epithelium of nasopharynx; epithelium of bronchus; gallbladder; bronchial epithelial cell / Top expressed in: epithelium of stomach; crypt of lieberkuhn of small intestine; mucous cell of stomach; transitional epithelium of urinary bladder; pyloric antrum; left colon; duodenum; conjunctival fornix; ileum; lactiferous gland; More reference expression data
BioGPS	More reference expression data
Gene ontology
Molecular function	protein-containing complex binding; structural constituent of muscle; structural constituent of cytoskeleton; protein binding; structural molecule activity
Cellular component	terminal web; plasma membrane; sarcolemma; costamere; dystrophin-associated glycoprotein complex; Z discdkac; extracellular exosome; intermediate filament; cell periphery; cytosol; apicolateral plasma membrane
Biological process	Notch signaling pathway; viral process; sarcomere organization; cell differentiation involved in embryonic placenta development; response to estrogen; keratinization; cornification
Sources:Amigo / QuickGO
Orthologs
Databases	NCBI: entry; OMA: entry
Species	Human	Mouse
Entrez	3880	16669
Ensembl	ENSG00000171345	ENSMUSG00000020911
UniProt	P08727	P19001
RefSeq (mRNA)	NM_002276	NM_008471; NM_001313963
RefSeq (protein)	NP_002267	NP_001300892; NP_032497
Location (UCSC)	Chr 17: 41.52 – 41.53 Mb	Chr 11: 100.03 – 100.04 Mb
PubMed search
- Wikidata
View/Edit Human	View/Edit Mouse

Keratin, type I cytoskeletal 19 (Keratin-19)) also known as cytokeratin-19 (CK-19) is a 40 kDa protein that in humans is encoded by the KRT19 gene. Keratin-19 is a type I keratin.

== Function ==
Keratin-19 is a member of the keratin family. The keratins are intermediate filament proteins responsible for the structural integrity of epithelial cells and are subdivided into cytokeratins and hair keratins.

Keratin-19 is a type I keratin. The type I cytokeratins consist of acidic proteins which are arranged in pairs of heterotypic keratin chains. Unlike its related family members, this smallest known acidic cytokeratin is not paired with a basic cytokeratin in epithelial cells. It is specifically found in the embryonic periderm, the transiently superficial layer that envelops the developing epidermis. The type I cytokeratins are clustered in a region of chromosome 17 (q12-q21).

== Use as biomarker ==
CYFRA 21-1, a soluble fragment of KRT19, is a tumor marker of various types of cancer, including lung, breast, stomach, pancreas, ovary. KRT19 is commonly expressed in carcinomas of these organs and CYFRA 21-1 is produced when KRT19 is cleaved during cell apoptosis.

Due to its high sensitivity, KRT19 is the most used marker for the RT-PCR-mediated detection of tumor cells disseminated in lymph nodes, peripheral blood, and bone marrow of breast cancer patients. Depending on the assays, KRT19 has been shown to be both a specific and a non-specific marker.

False positivity in CYFRA 21-1 / KRT19 RT-PCR studies include:

- illegitimate transcription (expression of small amounts of KRT19 mRNA by tissues in which it has no real physiological role)
- haematological disorders (KRT19 induction in peripheral blood cells by cytokines and growth factors, which circulate at higher concentrations in inflammatory conditions and neutropenia)
- the presence of pseudogenes (two KRT19 pseudogenes, KRT19a and KRT19b, have been identified, which have significant sequence homology to KRT19 mRNA. Subsequently, attempts to detect the expression of the authentic KRT19 may result in the detection of either or both of these pseudogenes)
- sample contamination (introduction of contaminating epithelial cells during peripheral blood sampling for subsequent RT-PCR analysis).
- trauma and stress (such as shear stress, heat shock, toxins, infection, aging and oxidative stress such as from smoking), which increase KRT19 expression and cell apoptosis
- weight loss and muscle wasting/apoptosis (KRT19 is expressed in muscle)

Moreover, Ck-19 is widely applied as post-operative diagnostic marker of papillary thyroid carcinoma.

Keratin-19 is often used together with keratin 8 and keratin 18 to differentiate cells of epithelial origin from hematopoietic cells in tests that enumerate circulating tumor cells in blood.

== Interactions ==
Keratin-19 has been shown to interact with Pinin.
