= Hair keratin =

Type of keratin found in hair and nails

Hair keratin is a type of keratin found in hair and the nails.

== Function ==
Originating from the embryonic epidermis, the hair follicle evolves into one of the most complex structures in the human body, comprising 7–8 distinct tissue sections. The base of the hair follicle contains the bulb, housing dermal fibroblasts known as the dermal papilla, crucial for morphogenesis and the hair follicle's cyclic activity. Encircling these cells is the matrix cell region, the hair follicle's proliferative compartment, responsible for the formation of different follicle compartments (except the ORS) and the production of crucial structural elements of hair - hair keratins and associated proteins known as KAPs.

Keratin is a crucial fibrous protein found in animals, constituting tough structures like hair, feathers, nails, and horns. It's classified based on tissue origin and sulfur content: soft keratins have lower sulfur, while hard keratins, found in hair and claws, contain more sulfur, creating a stronger structure. Keratins belong to two types - acidic Type I and neutral-basic Type II, further categorized into Type I a and b, and Type II a and b. The initial step in forming keratin is the alignment of type I and type II keratin polypeptides to create a heterodimer, which then aggregates into higher-order structural units. Similar to other intermediate filament subunit proteins, a prevalent secondary structure exists: a well-preserved, central alpha-helical domain made up of four coiled-coil segments along with non-helical end-terminal domains that vary in sequences and lengths [14]. Recent findings suggest that the interaction between acidic and basic soft keratins initiates with the creation of a heterodimer. This heterodimer comprises an acidic and a basic monomeric keratin. Two of these heterodimers then combine to form a tetramer, which subsequently polymerizes, resulting in the formation of the final 10-nanometer filamentous structure.

=== Stability ===
Due to their role as structural stabilizers in epithelial cells, keratin filaments have garnered significant interest across biology, embryology, pathology, and dermatology. This fundamental cytoskeletal function extends beyond individual cell levels. Typically, keratin filaments are integrated into desmosomes (see Fig. 1b, d) and hemidesmosomes, contributing not only to cell-to-cell stability but also to the attachment to the basement membrane and the connective tissue within a particular epithelium. In non-stratified (simple) epithelia of internal organs experiencing minimal mechanical stress, only a few keratin types form sparsely distributed filaments within the cytoplasm. However, a more substantial number of keratin types participate in the intermediate filament cytoskeletal framework of squamous epithelia, which becomes more prominent in cornified stratified epithelia like the epidermis covering the body's outer surface. Here, keratins are abundant and densely packed, forming tonofilaments.

=== Wound Healing ===
Recent attention has been drawn to the remarkable wound-healing capabilities and excellent biocompatibility of keratin derived from human hair. While recombinant keratin proteins produced via recombinant DNA technology offer higher purity compared to extracted keratin, their wound-healing properties have remained unclear. Two recombinant trichocyte keratins—human type I hair keratin 37 and human type II hair keratin 81—were expressed using a bacterial expression system and subsequently forming recombinant keratin nanoparticles (RKNPs) through ultrasonic dispersion. It has been revealed that RKNPs significantly boosted cell proliferation and migration in laboratory settings. Moreover, when applied to dermal wounds in vivo, RKNPs facilitated improved wound healing, leading to enhanced epithelialization, vascularization, collagen deposition, and remodeling. Importantly, tests for in vivo biocompatibility showed no signs of systemic toxicity. RKNPs have potential as a promising approach for advancing wound healing and suggests new avenues for developing keratin-based biomaterials.

=== Reduced Bleeding ===
In vivo haemostasis efficacy studies were conducted using rat models of liver puncture and femoral artery injury. For both models, K37 and K81 (10 mg) were applied to cover the wound areas. In the liver puncture model, bleeding time significantly decreased with recombinant K37 (approximately 38 s) and K81 (approximately 40 s) compared to the vehicle alone (approximately 170 s, p < .01), with notably reduced total blood loss (p < .01). Furthermore, in the femoral artery injury model, the recombinant keratin proteins significantly reduced bleeding time compared to the control group (approximately 50 s vs. 270 s). Notably, K37 and K81 exhibited stronger haemostatic effects than extracted keratins (approximately 80 s) in treating rat liver injury. Additionally, the recombinant keratin proteins demonstrated a robust capacity to promote the formation of a fibrin clot at the injury site, effectively stopping the bleeding. Consequently, recombinant human hair keratins offer potential for developing novel haemostatic products based on keratin biomaterials.

== Types ==
There are two types of hair keratin:

- acidic type I hair keratin
  - type I hair keratin 1, KRT31
  - type I hair keratin 2, KRT32
  - type I hair keratin 3A, KRT33A
  - type I hair keratin 3B, KRT33B
  - type I hair keratin 4, KRT34
  - type I hair keratin 5, KRT35
  - type I hair keratin 6, KRT36
  - type I hair keratin 7, KRT37
  - type I hair keratin 8, KRT38
- basic type II hair keratin
  - type II hair keratin 1, KRT81
  - type II hair keratin 2, KRT82
  - type II hair keratin 3, KRT83
  - type II hair keratin 4, KRT84
  - type II hair keratin 5, KRT85
  - type II hair keratin 6, KRT86

== Associated proteins ==
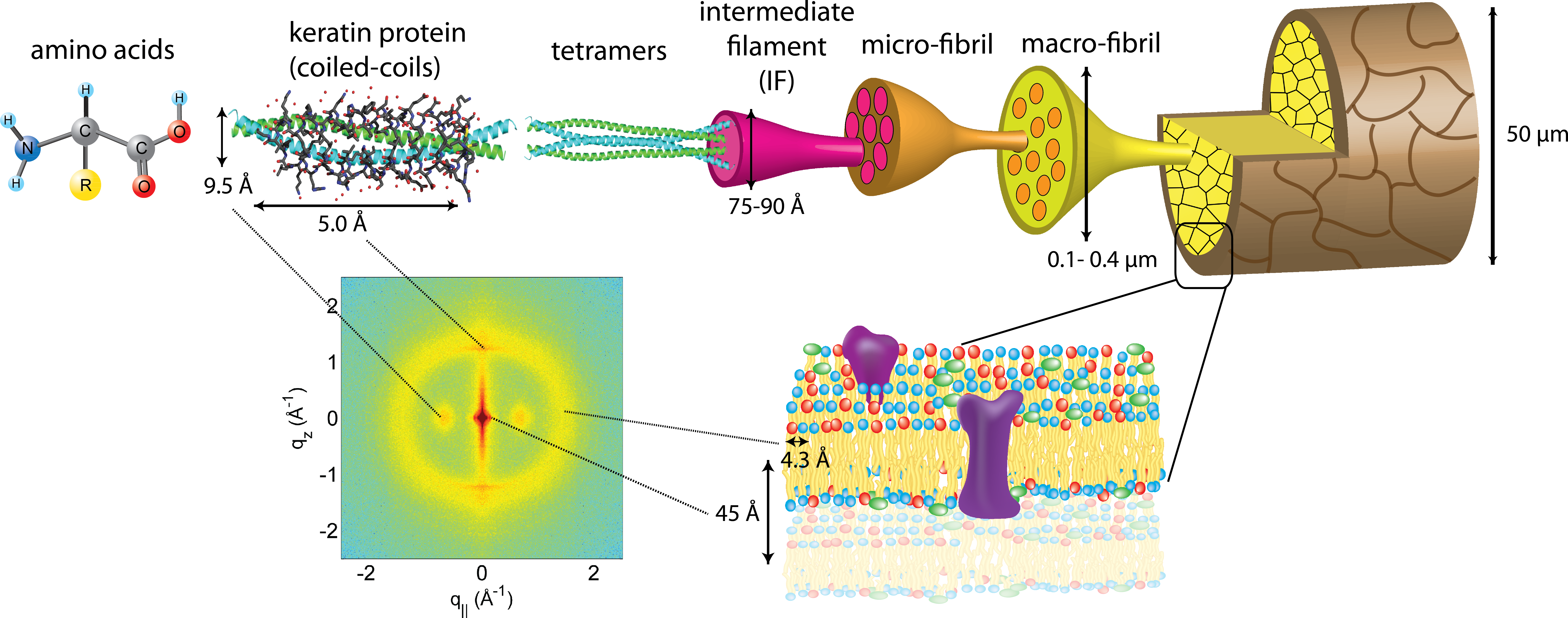
The arrangement of hair's layers—the cortex and cuticle—forms a hierarchical structure. The cortex primarily consists of a keratin coiled-coil protein phase. These proteins assemble into intermediate filaments, progressively forming larger fibers. Enveloping the hair is the cuticle, composed of deceased cells. X-ray data from various samples consistently reveal specific signals associated with the coiled-coil keratin phase, intermediate filament development in the cortex, and the cell membrane complex. The figure demonstrates signal assignments and their respective length scales.

The hair shaft is majorly composed of hair keratins and their associated proteins (KRTAPs). KRTAPs are products of diverse gene families resulting from gene duplication events in their evolutionary history. These genes are typically small, comprising a single exon less than 1,000 base pairs long. Over the last decade, numerous KRTAP genes have been identified across mammals, including humans. They are categorized into three groups based on their amino acid composition: high sulfur (with <30 mol% cysteine), ultrahigh sulfur (>30 mol% cysteine), and high glycine/tyrosine. Hair keratins form intermediate filaments (KIFs) within trichocytes, specialized cells that contribute to hair formation. As these cells move upward in the cortex, KIFs aggregate, surrounded by a space called the matrix. KRTAPs, also known as KAPs, are a significant part of this matrix between KIFs. It's suggested that KRTAPs play a role in establishing a cross-linked network with KIFs, contributing to the creation of the rigid hair shaft.

== Gene expression ==
During hair growth, as follicle bulb cells swiftly transform into cortical or cuticle hair keratinocytes, approximately 50-100 keratin genes become activated at the transcriptional level. However, this intricate process can be simplified into a few highly preserved gene families. In cortical keratinocytes, distinct patterns of keratin gene expression are evident, indicating the presence of different hierarchical transcription processes among various cell types. Examination of keratin gene promoter regions reveals conserved sequence motifs that might govern these cell-specific traits. Moreover, through the isolation of related sheep and human cuticle keratin genes, conserved DNA motifs and expression patterns during cuticle cell differentiation have been discovered. Further, the expression of sheep wool follicle IF and high-sulfur keratin genes in transgenic mice suggests that the regulatory DNA elements and proteins associated with hair keratin genes maintain functional conservation across mammalian species.

== Clinical significance ==
=== Breast cancer ===
Keratin constitutes a large multigene family known as cytokeratins. These cytokeratins are differentially expressed across various epithelial types and have been extensively studied as markers for breast cancer. They are categorized into acidic type I and basic-to-neutral type II cytokeratins. The intermediate filament network is formed by the necessary pairing of equal amounts of type I and type II keratins. While hair keratins, such as KRT81, are typical in hard-keratinized structures like hair and nails, they are thought to serve as structural proteins specific to these organs without expression elsewhere, such as the mammary gland.

KRT81, a type II hair keratin, is a major hair protein expressed in the hair cortex. Despite being typically associated with hair structures, KRT81 expression has been observed in the SKBR3 human breast cancer cell line and metastatic lymph nodes of breast carcinomas, but not in normal breast epithelial cells. Moreover, the expressed KRT81 was found to be a 5′-truncated isoform (ΔHb1), with the full-length protein not being expressed. However, the exact function of this truncated form in breast cancer cells remains unclear.

Western blot analysis detected the presence of the complete 55-kDa KRT81 in various human breast cancer cell lines (MCF7, SKBR3, MDA-MB-231), normal human mammary epithelial cells (HMEC), and non-neoplastic cells (MCF10A). Reverse transcription-polymerase chain reaction confirmed the expression of the full-length KRT81, encompassing its 5' region, in breast cells. Immunohistochemical and immunofluorescence examinations located KRT81 within the cytoplasm. Additionally, in KRT81-knockdown MDA-MB231 cells, zymography illustrated decreased MMP9 activity, while scratch and invasion assays demonstrated diminished cell migration and invasion capabilities. This presents the first evidence of complete KRT81 expression in both normal breast epithelial cells and breast cancer cells. Furthermore, the findings suggest that KRT81 plays a role in the migration and invasion of breast cancer cells.
