= Keratin 21 =

Protein found in rats

Keratin 21 is a type I cytokeratin which expresses immunologically specific fusion protein. It is not found in humans, but only in Rattus norvegicus. It is first detectable after 18–19 days of gestation.
