= KRT86 =

Protein-coding gene in the species Homo sapiens

Identifiers
- Aliases: KRT86, HB6, Hb1, KRTHB1, KRTHB6, MNX, hHb6, K86, keratin 86
- External IDs: OMIM: 601928; MGI: 109362; GeneCards: KRT86

Gene location (Human)
| Chr. | Chromosome 12 (human) |
| Band | 12q13.13 | Start | 52,249,300 bp |
| Band | 12q13.13 | End | 52,309,163 bp |

Gene location (Mouse)
| Chr. | Chromosome 15 (mouse) |
| Band | 15 F2|15 56.9 cM | Start | 101,371,359 bp |
| Band | 15 F2|15 56.9 cM | End | 101,377,867 bp |
RNA expression pattern
| Bgee | Human / Mouse (ortholog); Top expressed in: testicle; right coronary artery; skin of arm; buccal mucosa cell; hair follicle; ascending aorta; amniotic fluid; left coronary artery; tibialis anterior muscle; decidua / Top expressed in: lip; granulocyte; Ileal epithelium; embryo; entorhinal cortex; lactiferous gland; skin of back; hair follicle; skin of abdomen; CA3 field; More reference expression data |
| BioGPS | n/a |
Gene ontology
| Molecular function | protein binding; structural molecule activity |
| Cellular component | keratin filament; extracellular exosome; intermediate filament; extracellular space; cytosol |
| Biological process | keratinization; cornification |
Sources:Amigo / QuickGO
Orthologs
| Databases | NCBI: entry; OMA: entry |
| Species | Human | Mouse |
| Entrez | 3892 | 16679 |
| Ensembl | ENSG00000170442 | ENSMUSG00000067614 |
| UniProt | O43790 | P97861 |
| RefSeq (mRNA) | NM_002284; NM_001320198 | NM_010667 |
| RefSeq (protein) | NP_001307127 | NP_034797 |
| Location (UCSC) | Chr 12: 52.25 – 52.31 Mb | Chr 15: 101.37 – 101.38 Mb |
| PubMed search |
- Wikidata
| View/Edit Human | View/Edit Mouse |

The KRT86 gene encodes for keratin, type II cuticular Hb6 protein in humans.

The protein encoded by this gene is a member of the keratin gene family. As a type II hair keratin, it is a basic protein which heterodimerizes with type I keratins to form hair and nails. The type II hair keratins are clustered in a region of chromosome 12q13 and are grouped into two distinct subfamilies based on structure similarity. One subfamily, consisting of KRT81, KRT83, and KRT86, is highly related. The other, less-related subfamily includes KRT82, KRT84, and KRT85. All hair keratins are expressed in the hair follicle; this hair keratin, as well as KRT81 and KRT83, is found primarily in the hair cortex. Mutations in this gene and KRT81 have been observed in patients with a rare dominant hair disease, monilethrix.
