= Monilethrix =

Genetic disorder resulting in short, brittle, beaded hair

- Other names: Moniliform hair syndrome
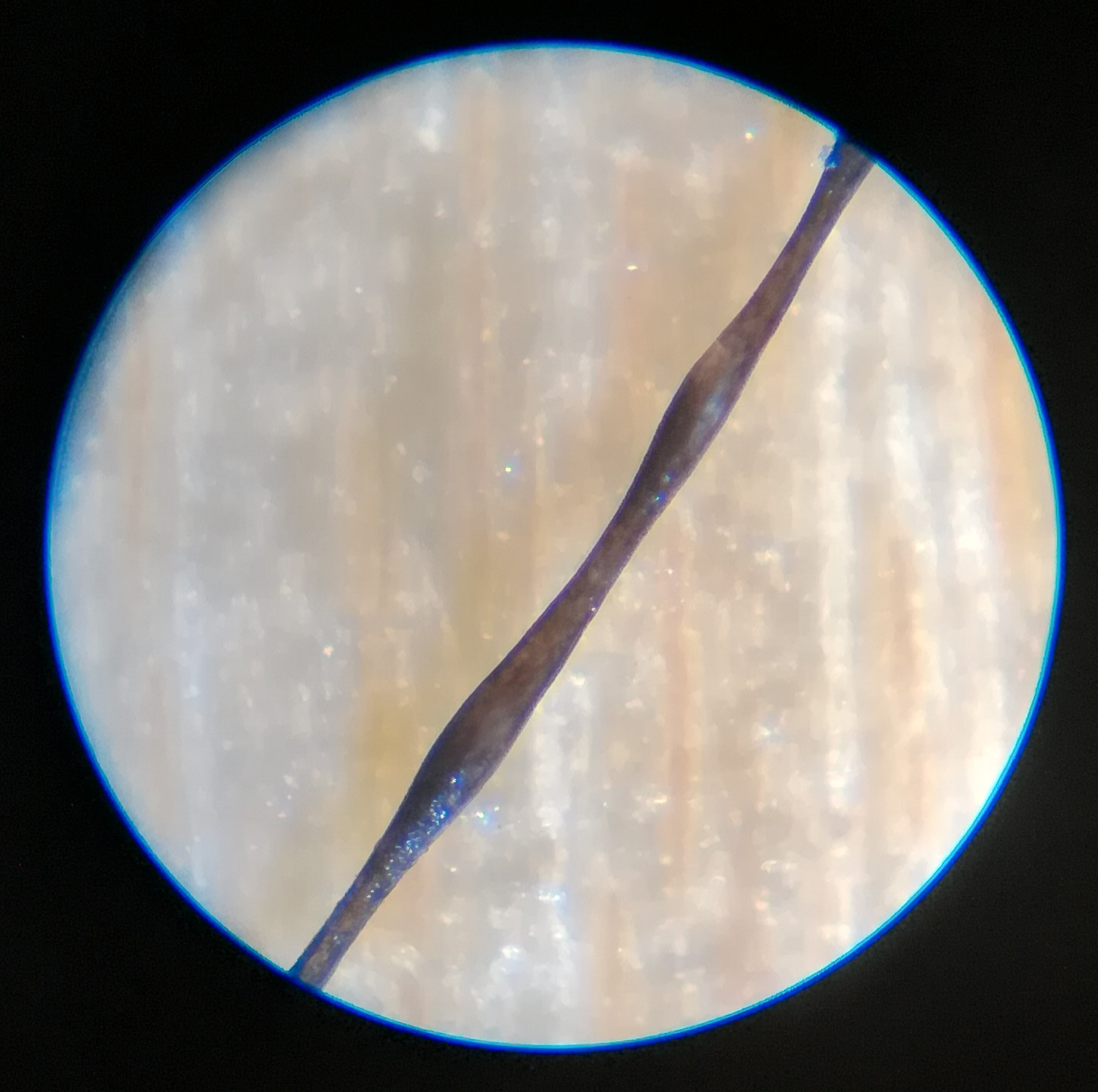
- Beaded hair (60x magnification)
- Specialty: Medical genetics

Monilethrix (also referred to as beaded hair) is a rare autosomal dominant hair disease that results in short, fragile, broken hair that appears beaded. It comes from the Latin word for necklace (monile) and the Greek word for hair (thrix). Hair becomes brittle, and breaks off at the thinner parts between the beads. It appears as a thinning or baldness of hair and was first described in 1897 by Walter Smith

== Signs and symptoms ==
Some indicators of monilethrix are small bumps on the skin, mainly on the scalp, neck and arms. In most cases, firm, dark papules, covered with dark scales and crusts appears on the skin, especially the scalp. The affected individual would have beaded hair strands. The possible areas for the hair loss are the eyebrows, eyelashes, limbs, and pubic region. Hair strands are usually dull, dry, and brittle. The strands are prone to mild to severe breakage, causing onset alopecia, especially during pregnancy. Fingernail and toenails tend to appear abnormal. The onset for this disease varies from person to person. The frequency of monilethrix is currently unknown.

== Presentation ==
Newborns are not born with Monilethrix; it usually develops within the first few months of life. The presentation may be of alopecia (baldness). Individuals vary in severity of symptoms. Nail deformities may also be present as well as hair follicle keratosis and follicular hyperkeratosis. Depending on severity it can effect hair on all areas of the body including head hair, arm and leg hair, pubic hair, underarm hair, eyebrows, and eyelashes. The hair is seen under a microscope with bumps in the hair strand. These cause the hair to be brittle and break in the thinner sections. Severe cases of monilethrix can also affect finger and toe nails causing abnormal growth. Monilethrix can also cause keratosis pilaris (small bumps on the skin). Less severe cases of Monilethrix may only affect certain parts of the scalp, usually the back of the head and neck.

Monilethrix has an autosomal dominant pattern of inheritance.

== Diagnosis ==
Monilethrix may be diagnosed with trichoscopy and other forms of dermoscopy. Light microscopic examination is diagnostic and reveals elliptical nodes of normal thickness and intermittent constrictions, internodes at which the hair easily breaks. Under examination, the hair is beaded. The beading is the result of a periodic narrowing of the shaft with nodes separated by about 0.7 mm. In general, there is a tendency for spontaneous improvement with time, especially during puberty and pregnancy, but the condition never disappears completely.

== Genetics ==
Monilethrix is caused by mutations affecting the genes KRTHB1 (KRT81), KRTHB3 (KRT83), or KRTHB6 (KRT86) which code for type II hair cortex keratins. The disorder is inherited in an autosomal dominant manner. This means that the defective gene(s) responsible for the disorder is located on an autosome, and only one copy of the gene is sufficient to cause the disorder, when inherited from a parent who has the disorder. If an affected parent and an unaffected parent have children, 50% of the time they will be affected by Monilethrix. It can be equally present in both males and females.

== Treatment ==
No specific treatment exists for monilethrix. Spontaneous resolution following puberty has occurred in some cases. In affected females, the condition improves during pregnancy. Genetic counseling will be of benefit for affected individuals and their families. Other treatment is symptomatic and supportive.

== Epidemiology ==
Currently, the frequency for this disease is unknown and affects both men and women. Signs and symptoms either show up spontaneously at birth or around the age of 2. The symptoms may change or remain the same throughout one's life, but are usually present after the first few months after birth.

== See also ==
- List of cutaneous conditions
- List of conditions caused by problems with junctional proteins
- List of cutaneous conditions caused by mutations in keratins
