= KRT31 =

Protein-coding gene in humans

Identifiers
- Aliases: KRT31, HA1, Ha-1, KRTHA1, hHa1, keratin 31
- External IDs: OMIM: 601077; MGI: 1309991; GeneCards: KRT31

Gene location (Human)
Chr.	Chromosome 17 (human)
Band	17q21.2	Start	41,393,721 bp
Band	17q21.2	End	41,397,608 bp

Gene location (Mouse)
Chr.	Chromosome 11 (mouse)
Band	11 D|11 63.37 cM	Start	99,914,460 bp
Band	11 D|11 63.37 cM	End	99,920,694 bp
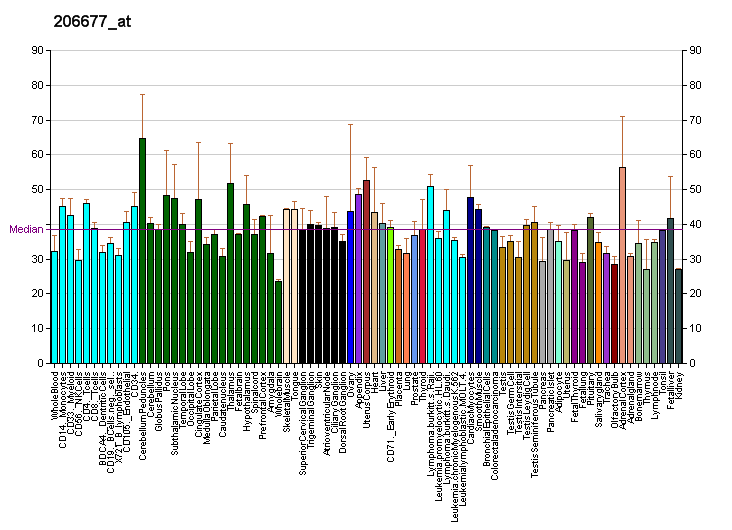

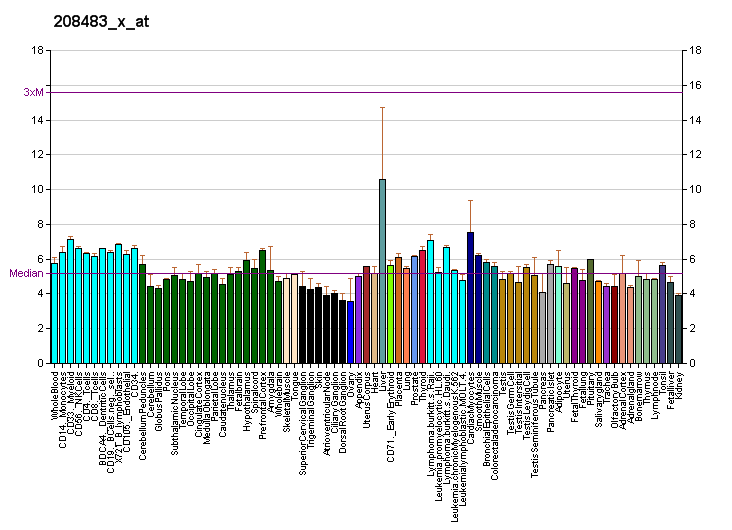
RNA expression pattern
Bgee	Human / Mouse (ortholog); Top expressed in: cerebellum; cerebellar cortex; cerebellar hemisphere; right hemisphere of cerebellum; skin of abdomen; testicle; skin of leg; muscle of thigh; mucosa of esophagus; anterior cingulate cortex / Top expressed in: lip; hair; filiform papilla; outer root sheath of hair follicle; ankle joint; embryo; cortex of hair; skin of back; skin of abdomen; dermis; More reference expression data
BioGPS	More reference expression data
Gene ontology
Molecular function	structural constituent of cytoskeleton; protein binding; structural molecule activity
Cellular component	extracellular exosome; intermediate filament; extracellular space; cytosol
Biological process	epidermis development; cytoskeleton organization; keratinization; cornification
Sources:Amigo / QuickGO
Orthologs
Databases	NCBI: entry; OMA: entry
Species	Human	Mouse
Entrez	3881	16671
Ensembl	ENSG00000094796; ENSG00000262993	ENSMUSG00000057723
UniProt	Q15323	Q61897
RefSeq (mRNA)	NM_002277	NM_013570
RefSeq (protein)	NP_002268	NP_038598
Location (UCSC)	Chr 17: 41.39 – 41.4 Mb	Chr 11: 99.91 – 99.92 Mb
PubMed search
- Wikidata
View/Edit Human	View/Edit Mouse

Keratin, type I cuticular Ha1 is a protein that in humans is encoded by the KRT31 gene.

== Function ==
The protein encoded by this gene is a member of the keratin gene family. As a Type I hair keratin, it is an acidic protein which heterodimerizes with type II keratins to form hair and nails. The type I hair keratins are clustered in a region of chromosome 17q21.2 and have the same direction of transcription.
