= Prehistory of nakedness and clothing =

Nakedness and clothing use are characteristics of humans related by evolutionary and social prehistory. The major loss of body hair distinguishes humans from other primates. Current evidence indicates that anatomically-modern humans were naked in prehistory for at least 90,000 years before they invented clothing. Today, isolated Indigenous peoples in tropical climates continue to be without clothing in many everyday activities.

== Evolution of hairlessness ==
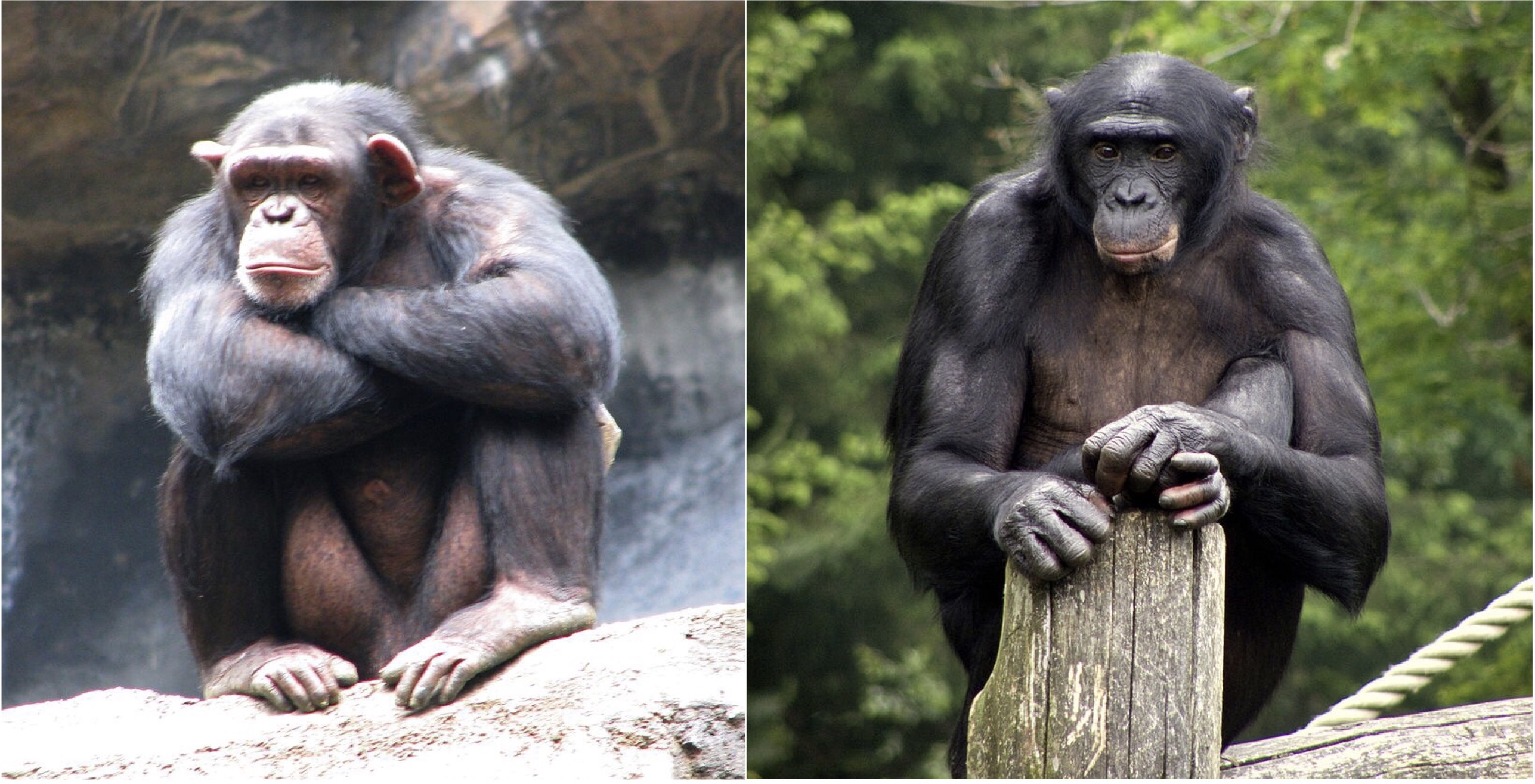
Humans' closest living relatives, like chimpanzees (left) and bonobos (right), have both extensive areas of fur and also bare patches

The general hairlessness of humans in comparison to related species may be due to loss of functionality in the pseudogene called KRT41P (which helps produce keratin) in the human lineage about 240,000 years ago. On an individual basis, mutations in the gene HR can lead to complete hair loss, though this is not typical in humans. Humans may also lose their hair as a result of hormonal imbalance due to drugs or pregnancy.

To comprehend why humans have significantly less body hair than other primates, one must understand that mammalian body hair is not merely an aesthetic characteristic; it protects the skin from wounds, bites, heat, cold, and ultraviolet radiation. Additionally, it can be used as a communication tool and as a camouflage.

The first member of the genus Homo to be hairless was Homo erectus, originating about 1.6 million years ago. The dissipation of body heat remains the most widely accepted evolutionary explanation for the loss of body hair in early members of the genus Homo, the surviving member of which is modern humans. Less hair and an increase in sweat glands made it easier for their bodies to cool when they moved from living in shady forest to open savanna. This change in environment also resulted in a change in diet, from largely vegetarian to hunting-gathering. Pursuing game on the savanna also increased the need for regulation of body heat.

The anthropologist and paleo-biologist Nina Jablonski posits that the ability to dissipate excess body heat through eccrine sweating helped make possible the dramatic enlargement of the brain, the most temperature-sensitive organ in the human body. Thus the loss of fur was also a factor in further adaptations, both physical and behavioral, that differentiated humans from other primates. Some of these changes are thought to be the result of sexual selection: by selecting more hairless mates, humans accelerated changes initiated by natural selection. Sexual selection may also account for the remaining human hair in the pubic area and armpits, which are sites for pheromones, while hair on the head continued to provide protection from the sun. Anatomically-modern humans, whose traits include hairlessness, evolved 260,000 to 350,000 years ago.

=== Phenotypic changes ===
Humans are the only primate species to have undergone significant hair loss, and of the approximately 5000 extant species of mammal, only a handful are effectively hairless. This list includes elephants, rhinoceroses, hippopotamuses, walruses, some species of pigs, whales and other cetaceans, and naked mole rats. Most mammals have light skin that is covered by fur, and biologists believe that early human ancestors started out this way also. Dark skin probably evolved after humans lost their body fur, because the naked skin was vulnerable to the strong UV radiation as explained in the Out of Africa hypothesis. Therefore, evidence of the time when human skin darkened has been used to date the loss of human body hair, assuming that the dark skin was needed after the fur was gone.

With the loss of fur, darker, high-melanin skin evolved as a protection from ultraviolet radiation damage. As humans migrated outside of the tropics, varying degrees of depigmentation evolved in order to permit UVB-induced synthesis of previtamin D_{3}. The relative lightness of female compared to male skin in a given population may be due to the greater need for women to produce more vitamin D during lactation.

The sweat glands in humans could have evolved to spread from the hands and feet as the body hair changed, or the hair change could have occurred to facilitate sweating. Horses and humans are two of the few animals capable of sweating on most of their body, yet horses are larger and still have fully developed fur. In humans, the skin hairs lie flat in hot conditions, as the arrector pili muscles relax, preventing heat from being trapped by a layer of still air between the hairs, and increasing heat loss by convection.

=== Sexual selection hypothesis ===
Another hypothesis for the thick body hair on humans proposes that Fisherian runaway sexual selection played a role (as well as in the selection of long head hair), (see terminal and vellus hair), as well as a much larger role of testosterone in males. Sexual selection is the only theory thus far that explains the sexual dimorphism seen in the hair patterns of males and females. On average, males have more body hair than females. Males have more terminal hair, especially on the face, chest, abdomen, and back, and females have more vellus hair, which is less visible. The halting of hair development at a juvenile stage, vellus hair, would also be consistent with the neoteny evident in humans, especially in females, and thus they could have occurred at the same time. This theory, however, has significant holdings in today's cultural norms. There is no evidence that sexual selection would proceed to such a drastic extent over a million years ago when a full, lush coat of hair would most likely indicate health and would therefore be more likely to be selected for, not against.

=== Water-dwelling hypothesis ===
The aquatic ape hypothesis (AAH) includes hair loss as one of several characteristics of modern humans that could indicate adaptations to an aquatic environment. Serious consideration may be given by contemporary anthropologists to some hypotheses related to AAH, but hair loss is not one of them.

=== Parasite hypothesis ===
A divergent explanation of humans' relative hairlessness holds that ectoparasites (such as ticks) residing in fur became problematic as humans became hunters living in larger groups with a "home base". Nakedness would also make the lack of parasites apparent to prospective mates. However, this theory is inconsistent with the abundance of parasites that continue to exist in the remaining patches of human hair.

The "ectoparasite" explanation of modern human nakedness is based on the principle that a hairless primate would harbor fewer parasites. When our ancestors adopted group-dwelling social arrangements roughly 1.8 Mya (million years ago), ectoparasite loads increased dramatically. Early humans became the only one of the 193 primate species to have fleas, which can be attributed to the close living arrangements of large groups of individuals. While primate species have communal sleeping arrangements, these groups are always on the move and thus are less likely to harbor ectoparasites. However, humans have as many follicles as other primates, but the hair is shorter and finer. This "peach fuzz" may have been retained because it both allows humans to detect the presence of ectoparasites while inhibiting their movement on the skin.

It was expected that dating the split of the ancestral human louse into two species, the head louse and the pubic louse, would date the loss of body hair in human ancestors. However, it turned out that the human pubic louse does not descend from the ancestral human louse, but from the gorilla louse, diverging 3.3 million years ago. This suggests that humans had lost body hair (but retained head hair) and developed thick pubic hair prior to this date, were living in or close to the forest where gorillas lived, and acquired pubic lice from butchering gorillas or sleeping in their nests. The evolution of the body louse from the head louse, on the other hand, places the date of clothing much later, some 100,000 years ago.

== Origin of clothing ==
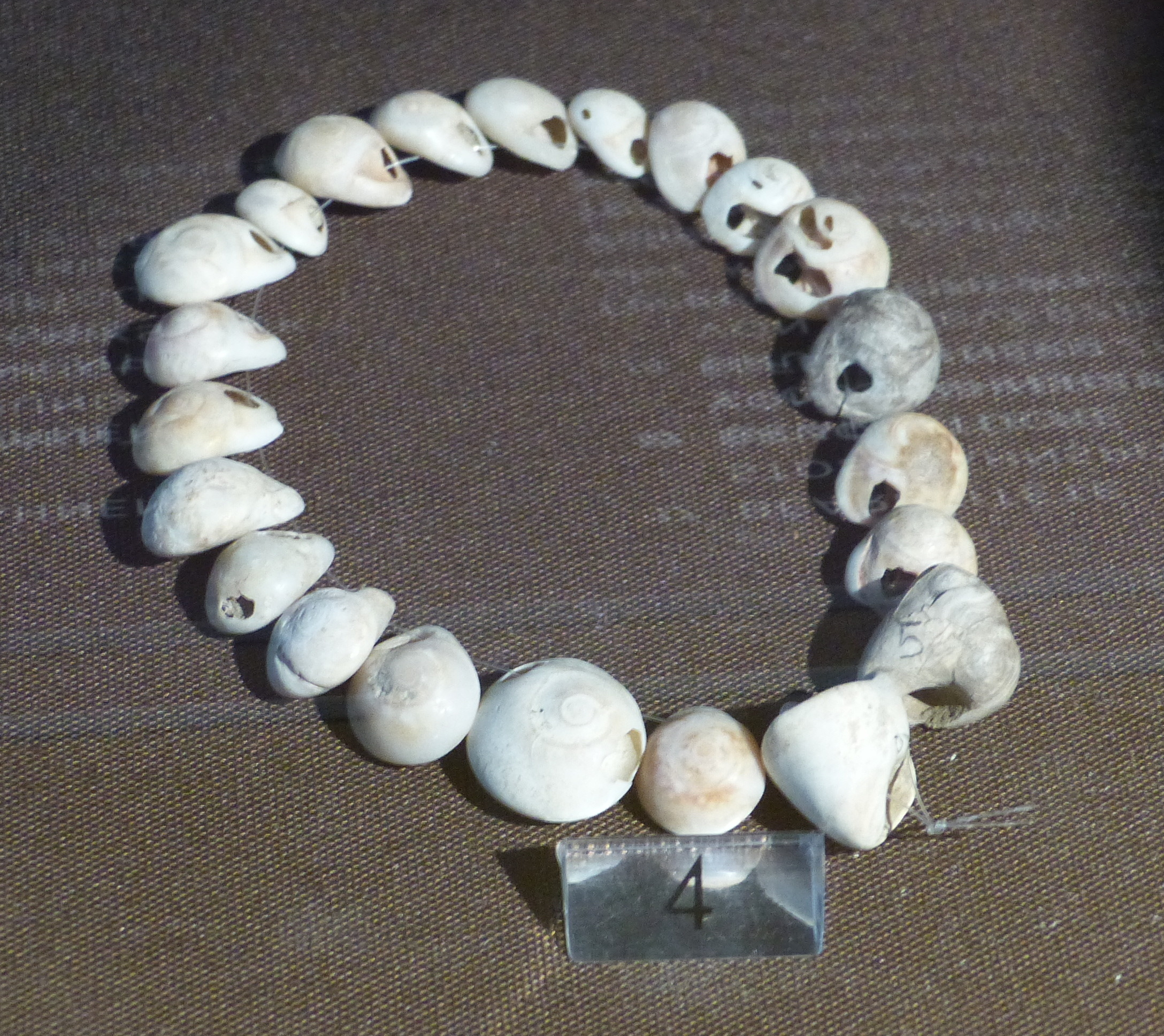
A necklace reconstructed from perforated sea snail shells from Upper Palaeolithic Europe, dated between 39,000 and 25,000 BCE. The practice of body adornment is associated with the emergence of behavioral modernity.

A 2010 study published in Molecular Biology and Evolution indicates that the habitual wearing of clothing began at some point in time between 83,000 and 170,000 years ago based upon a genetic analysis indicating when clothing lice diverged from their head louse ancestors. That information suggests that the use of clothing likely originated with anatomically-modern humans in Africa prior to their migration to colder climates, which made the migration possible.

Some of the technology for what is now called clothing may have originated to make other types of adornment, including jewelry, body paint, tattoos, and other body modifications, "dressing" the naked body without concealing it. According to Mark Leary and Nicole R. Buttermore, body adornment is one of the changes that occurred in the late Paleolithic (40,000 to 60,000 years ago) in which humans became not only anatomically modern but also behaviorally modern, and capable of self-reflection and symbolic interaction. More recent studies place the use of adornment at 77,000 years ago in South Africa, and 90,000—100,000 years ago in Palestine and Algeria. While modesty may be a factor, often overlooked purposes for body coverings are camouflage used by hunters, body armor, and costumes used to impersonate "spirit-beings".

The origin of complex, fitted clothing required the invention of fine stone knives for cutting skins into pieces, and the eyed needle for sewing. This was done by Cro-Magnons, who migrated to Europe around 35,000 years ago. The Neanderthal occupied the same region, but became extinct in part because they could not make fitted garments, but draped themselves with crudely cut skins—based upon their simple stone tools—which did not provide the warmth needed to survive as the climate grew colder in the Last Glacial Period. In addition to being less functional, the simple wrappings would not have been habitually worn by Neanderthal because they were more tolerant to the cold than Homo sapiens and would not have acquired the secondary functions of decoration and promoting modesty.

The earliest archeological evidence of fabric clothing is inferred from representations in figurines in the southern Levant, dated between 11,700 and 10,500 years ago. The surviving examples of woven cloth are linen from Egypt dated 5000 BCE, while knotted or twisted flax fibers have been found as early as 7000 BCE.

Adults are rarely completely naked in modern societies and cover at least their genitals, but adornments and clothing often emphasize, enhance, or otherwise call attention to the sexuality of the body.

== Works cited ==
- Barber, E. J. W. (1991). Prehistoric Textiles: the Development of Cloth in the Neolithic and Bronze Ages with Special Reference to the Aegean. Princeton, N.J: Princeton University Press. ISBN 978-0-691-00224-8.
- Brown, Jeffrey G. (2021). "Ticks, Hair Loss, and Non-Clinging Babies: A Novel Tick-Based Hypothesis for the Evolutionary Divergence of Humans and Chimpanzees". Life. 11 (5): 435. Bibcode:2021Life...11..435B. doi:10.3390/life11050435. ISSN 2075-1729. PMC 8150933. PMID 34066043.
- Buckner, William (2021-12-01). "Disguises and the Origins of Clothing". Human Nature. 32 (4): 706–728. doi:10.1007/s12110-021-09415-7. ISSN 1936-4776. PMID 34643886. S2CID 238745503.
- Daley, Jason (11 December 2018). "Why Did Humans Lose Their Fur?". Smithsonian.
- Dávid-Barrett, Tamás; Dunbar, Robin I. M. (2016-05-01). "Bipedality and hair loss in human evolution revisited: The impact of altitude and activity scheduling". Journal of Human Evolution. 94: 72–82. Bibcode:2016JHumE..94...72D. doi:10.1016/j.jhevol.2016.02.006. ISSN 0047-2484. PMC 4874949. PMID 27178459.
- Davies, Stephen (2020). Adornment: What Self-Decoration Tells Us about Who We Are. London, UNITED KINGDOM: Bloomsbury Publishing Plc. ISBN 978-1-350-12100-3.
- Giles, James (2010-12-01). "Naked Love: The Evolution of Human Hairlessness". Biological Theory. 5 (4): 326–336. doi:10.1162/BIOT_a_00062. ISSN 1555-5550. S2CID 84164968.
- Gilligan, Ian (2007a). "Neanderthal Extinction and Modern Human Behaviour: The Role of Climate Change and Clothing". World Archaeology. 39 (4): 499–514. doi:10.1080/00438240701680492. hdl:1885/28508. ISSN 0043-8243. S2CID 162388264.
- Gilligan, Ian (2007b). "Clothing and modern human behaviour: prehistoric Tasmania as a case study". Archaeology in Oceania. 42 (3): 102–111. doi:10.1002/j.1834-4453.2007.tb00023.x. ISSN 1834-4453.
- Gilligan, Ian (2010). "The Prehistoric Development of Clothing: Archaeological Implications of a Thermal Model". Journal of Archaeological Method and Theory. 17 (1): 15–80. doi:10.1007/s10816-009-9076-x. S2CID 143004288.
- Gilligan, Ian (2018-12-13). Climate, Clothing, and Agriculture in Prehistory: Linking Evidence, Causes, and Effects. Cambridge University Press. doi:10.1017/9781108555883. ISBN 978-1-108-47008-7. S2CID 238146999.
- Hermansen, Ralph D. (2018). Down from the Trees: Man's Amazing Transition from Tree-Dwelling Ape Ancestors. Apple Academic Press. ISBN 978-0-429-46595-6.
- Hogenboom, Melissa (2016-09-19). "We Did Not Invent Clothes Simply to Stay Warm". BBC.
- Hollander, Anne (1978). Seeing Through Clothes. New York: Viking Press. ISBN 0-14-011084-4.
- Jablonski, Nina G.; Chaplin, George (2000). "The Evolution of Human Skin Coloration". Journal of Human Evolution. 39 (1): 57–106. Bibcode:2000JHumE..39...57J. doi:10.1006/jhev.2000.0403. PMID 10896812. S2CID 38445385.
- Jablonski, Nina G. (2006). Skin: A Natural History. Berkeley: University of California Press. ISBN 978-0-520-95481-6.
- Jablonski, Nina G.; Chaplin, George (2017). "The Colours of Humanity: The Evolution of Pigmentation in the Human Lineage". Philosophical Transactions of the Royal Society B: Biological Sciences. 372 (1724) 20160349. doi:10.1098/rstb.2016.0349. PMC 5444068. PMID 28533464.
- Jablonski, Nina G. (1 November 2012). "The Naked Truth". Scientific American.
- Jarrett, Paul; Scragg, Robert (2020). "Evolution, Prehistory and Vitamin D". International Journal of Environmental Research and Public Health. 17 (2): 646. doi:10.3390/ijerph17020646. PMC 7027011. PMID 31963858.
- Kushlan, James A. (1980). "The Evolution of Hairlessness in Man". The American Naturalist. 116 (5): 727–729. doi:10.1086/283663. JSTOR 2460629. S2CID 86463962.
- Leary, Mark R; Buttermore, Nicole R. (2003). "The Evolution of the Human Self: Tracing the Natural History of Self-Awareness". Journal for the Theory of Social Behaviour. 33 (4): 365–404. doi:10.1046/j.1468-5914.2003.00223.x.
- Levy, Janet (2020). The Genesis of the Textile Industry from Adorned Nudity to Ritual Regalia. Oxford: Archaeopress. ISBN 978-1-78969-449-9.
- Nowell, April (2010). "Defining Behavioral Modernity in the Context of Neandertal and Anatomically Modern Human Populations". Annual Review of Anthropology. 39 (1): 437–452. doi:10.1146/annurev.anthro.012809.105113.
- Rae, Todd C.; Koppe, Thomas (2014). "Sinuses and flotation: Does the aquatic ape theory hold water?". Evolutionary Anthropology: Issues, News, and Reviews. 23 (2): 60–64. doi:10.1002/evan.21408. ISSN 1520-6505. PMID 24753346. S2CID 5456280.
- Rantala, M. J. (2007). "Evolution of nakedness in Homo sapiens". Journal of Zoology. 273 (1): 1–7. doi:10.1111/j.1469-7998.2007.00295.x. S2CID 14182894.
- Ruxton, Graeme D.; Wilkinson, David M. (2011-12-27). "Avoidance of overheating and selection for both hair loss and bipedality in hominins". Proceedings of the National Academy of Sciences. 108 (52): 20965–20969. Bibcode:2011PNAS..10820965R. doi:10.1073/pnas.1113915108. PMC 3248486. PMID 22160694.
- Schlebusch; et al. (3 November 2017). "Southern African ancient genomes estimate modern human divergence to 350,000 to 260,000 years ago". Science. 358 (6363): 652–655. Bibcode:2017Sci...358..652S. doi:10.1126/science.aao6266. PMID 28971970. S2CID 206663925.
- Simmons, Pauline; Yarwood, Doreen; Laver, James; Murray, Anne Wood; Marly, Diana Julia Alexandra (April 6, 2022). "Dress - the Nature and Purposes of Dress". Britannica.
- Somel, Mehmet; Tang, Lin; Khaitovich, Philipp (2012). "The Role of Neoteny in Human Evolution: From Genes to the Phenotype". In Hirohisa Hirai; Hiroo Imai; Yasuhiro Go (eds.). Post-Genome Biology of Primates. Primatology Monographs. Tokyo: Springer. pp. 23–41. doi:10.1007/978-4-431-54011-3_3. ISBN 978-4-431-54011-3.
- Sutou, Shizuyo (2012). "Hairless mutation: a driving force of humanization from a human-ape common ancestor by enforcing upright walking while holding a baby with both hands". Genes to Cells. 17 (4): 264–272. doi:10.1111/j.1365-2443.2012.01592.x. PMC 3510307. PMID 22404045.
- Toups, M. A.; Kitchen, A.; Light, J. E.; Reed, D. L. (2010). "Origin of Clothing Lice Indicates Early Clothing Use by Anatomically Modern Humans in Africa". Molecular Biology and Evolution. 28 (1): 29–32. doi:10.1093/molbev/msq234. ISSN 0737-4038. PMC 3002236. PMID 20823373.
- Wade, Nicholas (19 August 2003). "Why Humans and Their Fur Parted Ways". The New York Times. Archived from the original on 2009-06-18.
- Wheeler, P.E. (1985). "The loss of functional body hair in man: the influence of thermal environment, body form and bipedality". Journal of Human Evolution. 14 (14): 23–28. Bibcode:1985JHumE..14...23W. doi:10.1016/S0047-2484(85)80091-9.
- Zukerman, Wendy (4 November 2011). "Skin 'sees' the light to protect against sunshine". New Scientist.
