= Type II keratin =

Proteins

Type II keratins (or Type II cytokeratins) constitutes the Type II intermediate filaments (IFs) of the intracytoplasmatic cytoskeleton, which is present in all mammalian epithelial cells. The type 2 cytokeratins consist of basic or neutral, high molecular weight proteins which in vivo are arranged in pairs of heterotypic Type I and Type II keratin chains, coexpressed during differentiation of simple and stratified epithelial tissues. It has been seen that Type II Keratins are developed before Type 1 keratins during human embryonic development.

Type II cytokeratins are encoded on chromosome 12q and encompasses: CK1, CK2, CK3, CK4, CK5, CK6, CK7 and CK8. Their molecular weight ranges from 52 kDa (CK8) to 67 kDa (CK18).

Overall, keratin type 2 plays a crucial role in maintaining the strength and integrity of the skin, hair, and nails. Mutations in keratin genes can lead to various genetic disorders that affect these tissues, such as epidermolysis bullosa simplex, a rare condition characterized by blistering and erosion of the skin and mucous membranes.

== Keratin 2 Types: 2A and 2B ==
Type II Keratins are divided into 2 subtypes: Type IIA Keratins and Type IIB Keratins. Type 2A keratins are expressed in tissues that require high levels of mechanical stress, such as the soles of the feet, while type 2B keratins are expressed in tissues that are subject to less stress, such as the palms of the hands.

=== Type IIA Keratins ===
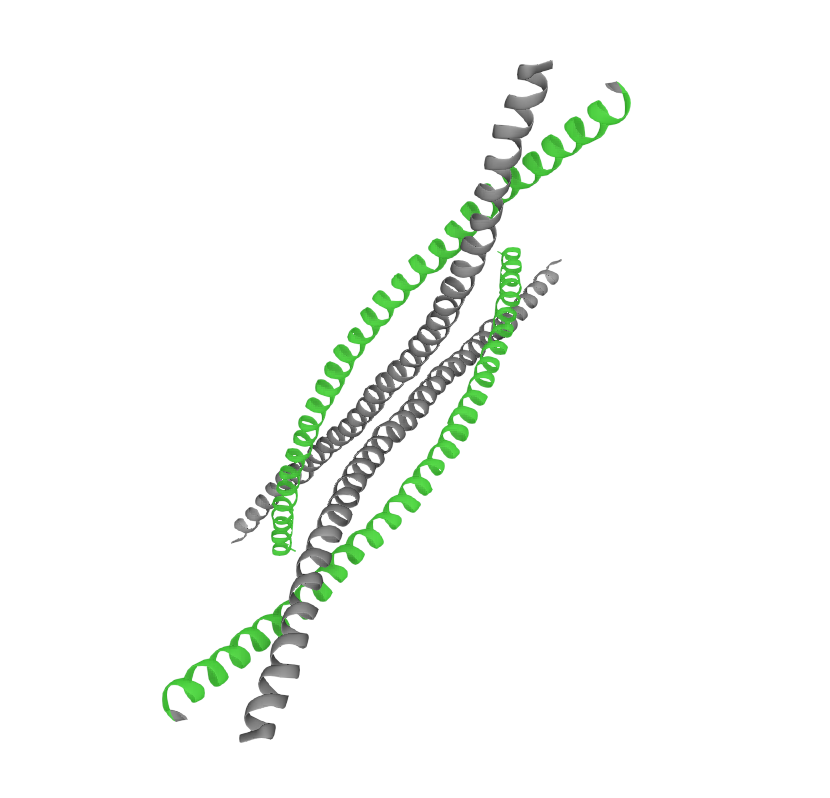
From Uniprot. Figure shows the structure of KRT1 gene. The helix is formed by the type II keratins in green, and the type I keratins in grey. The green coils consists of type IIA and IIB keratins. Expressed in upper leg skin, mammalian vulva, upper arm skin and 106 other tissues. Located on Chromosome 12, localized in the cell membrane and cytoplasm.

Type IIA Keratins are characterized by their expression in tissues that undergo high stress, like soles of the feet or palms of the hand. There are several different type 2A keratins that have been identified in humans, including K1, K2, K9, K10, K77, and K78. These keratins are expressed in a tissue-specific manner, with K1, K2, and K10 being predominantly expressed in the epidermis, while K9, K77, and K78 are expressed in the nail bed and hair follicles.

Type IIA keratins have a unique structural feature that allows them to form coiled-coil dimers, which then assemble into tetramers and eventually into intermediate filaments. This structural organization provides the mechanical strength and resilience necessary to withstand the stresses experienced by the tissues in which they are expressed. Mutations in type 2A keratin genes can lead to various genetic disorders, such as epidermolytic hyperkeratosis (EHK) and palmoplantar keratoderma (PPK), which are characterized by hyperkeratosis and blistering of the skin on the palms and soles.

=== Type IIB Keratins ===
Type IIB keratins are a group of intermediate filament proteins that are primarily expressed in epithelial tissues, such as the skin, nails, and hair follicles. They belong to the keratin family of proteins, which are characterized by their highly conserved alpha-helical coiled-coil domains. Keratin type IIB is encoded by the KRT6B gene and is often co-expressed with the equivalent keratin type IIA (KRT6A) in a variety of epithelial tissues. Together, these two proteins form heterodimers that assemble into intermediate filaments, which provide mechanical stability and resistance to mechanical stress. In addition to their structural role, type IIB keratins have been shown to play important roles in wound healing, inflammation, and cell migration. Dysregulation of type IIB keratin expression or mutations in the KRT6B gene have been associated with a variety of skin disorders, including psoriasis, epidermolysis bullosa, and pachyonychia congenita.

== See also ==
- Type I keratin
