= KRT23 =

Protein-coding gene in the species Homo sapiens

Identifiers
- Aliases: KRT23, CK23, HAIK1, K23, keratin 23
- External IDs: OMIM: 606194; MGI: 2148866; GeneCards: KRT23

Gene location (Human)
Chr.	Chromosome 17 (human)
Band	17q21.2	Start	40,922,700 bp
Band	17q21.2	End	40,937,646 bp

Gene location (Mouse)
Chr.	Chromosome 11 (mouse)
Band	11|11 D	Start	99,368,800 bp
Band	11|11 D	End	99,383,963 bp
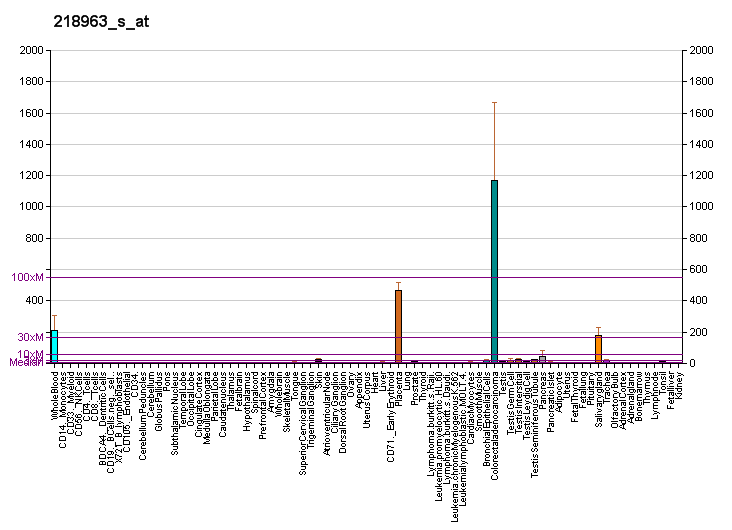
RNA expression pattern
Bgee	Human / Mouse (ortholog); Top expressed in: placenta; skin of leg; skin of abdomen; olfactory zone of nasal mucosa; salivary gland; minor salivary glands; blood; islet of Langerhans; tonsil; right uterine tube / Top expressed in: otic placode; esophagus; epithelium of stomach; lip; submandibular gland; skin of back; saccule; parotid gland; mucous cell of stomach; otic vesicle; More reference expression data
BioGPS	More reference expression data
Gene ontology
Molecular function	structural molecule activity
Cellular component	intermediate filament; cytosol
Biological process	keratinization; cornification
Sources:Amigo / QuickGO
Orthologs
Databases	NCBI: entry; OMA: entry
Species	Human	Mouse
Entrez	25984	94179
Ensembl	ENSG00000108244; ENSG00000263309	ENSMUSG00000006777
UniProt	Q9C075	Q99PS0
RefSeq (mRNA)	NM_001282433; NM_015515; NM_173213	NM_033373
RefSeq (protein)	NP_001269362; NP_056330	NP_203537
Location (UCSC)	Chr 17: 40.92 – 40.94 Mb	Chr 11: 99.37 – 99.38 Mb
PubMed search
- Wikidata
View/Edit Human	View/Edit Mouse

Keratin, type I cytoskeletal 23 is a protein that in humans is encoded by the KRT23 gene.

The protein encoded by this gene is a member of the keratin family. The keratins are intermediate filament proteins responsible for the structural integrity of epithelial cells and are subdivided into cytokeratin and hair keratin. The type I cytokeratins consist of acidic proteins which are arranged in pairs of heterotypic keratin chains. The type I cytokeratin genes are clustered in a region of chromosome 17q12-q21.
