= KRT36 =

Protein-coding gene in the species Homo sapiens

Identifiers
- Aliases: KRT36, HA6, KRTHA6, hHa6, keratin 36
- External IDs: OMIM: 604540; MGI: 109364; GeneCards: KRT36

Gene location (Human)
Chr.	Chromosome 17 (human)
Band	17q21.2	Start	41,486,136 bp
Band	17q21.2	End	41,492,546 bp

Gene location (Mouse)
Chr.	Chromosome 11 (mouse)
Band	11|11 D	Start	99,992,833 bp
Band	11|11 D	End	99,996,452 bp
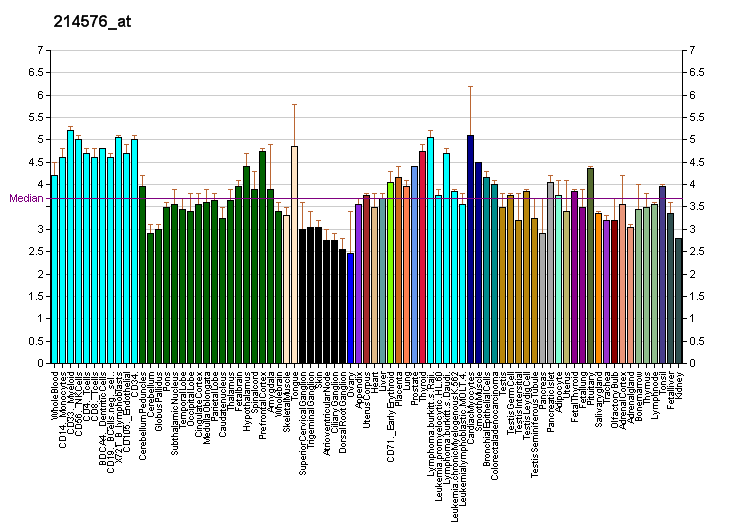
RNA expression pattern
Bgee	Human / Mouse (ortholog); Top expressed in: testicle; body of tongue; superior surface of tongue; mucosa of esophagus; spleen; cervix; lymph node; skin of limb; skin of leg; granulocyte / Top expressed in: lip; hair follicle; embryo; skin of external ear; skin of back; tongue; filiform papilla; skin of abdomen; mammary gland; oocyte; More reference expression data
BioGPS	More reference expression data
Gene ontology
Molecular function	structural molecule activity; structural constituent of skin epidermis
Cellular component	intermediate filament cytoskeleton; extracellular exosome; intermediate filament; cytosol
Biological process	regulation of keratinocyte differentiation; keratinization; cornification; biological process
Sources:Amigo / QuickGO
Orthologs
Databases	NCBI: entry; OMA: entry
Species	Human	Mouse
Entrez	8689	16673
Ensembl	ENSG00000126337	ENSMUSG00000020916
UniProt	O76013	B1AQ75
RefSeq (mRNA)	NM_003771	NM_001174099; NM_008472
RefSeq (protein)	NP_003762	NP_001167570
Location (UCSC)	Chr 17: 41.49 – 41.49 Mb	Chr 11: 99.99 – 100 Mb
PubMed search
- Wikidata
View/Edit Human	View/Edit Mouse

Keratin, type I cuticular Ha6 is a protein that in humans is encoded by the KRT36 gene.

The protein encoded by this gene is a member of the keratin gene family. This type I hair keratin is an acidic protein which heterodimerizes with type II keratins to form hair and nails. The type I hair keratins are clustered in a region of chromosome 17q21.2 and have the same direction of transcription.
