= KRT38 =

Protein-coding gene in the species Homo sapiens

Identifiers
- Aliases: KRT38, HA8, KRTHA8, hHa8, keratin 38
- External IDs: OMIM: 604542; GeneCards: KRT38

Gene location (Human)
Chr.	Chromosome 17 (human)
Band	17q21.2	Start	41,436,154 bp
Band	17q21.2	End	41,440,983 bp
RNA expression pattern
Bgee	Human / Mouse (ortholog); Top expressed in: hair follicle; skin of thigh; skin of abdomen; pharynx; tonsil; head; gonad; mouth; mucosa of esophagus; salivary gland / n/a; More reference expression data
BioGPS	n/a
Gene ontology
Molecular function	protein binding; structural molecule activity
Cellular component	intermediate filament; extracellular exosome; cytosol
Biological process	keratinization; cornification
Sources:Amigo / QuickGO
Orthologs
Databases	NCBI: entry; OMA: entry
Species	Human	Mouse
Entrez	8687	n/a
Ensembl	ENSG00000171360	n/a
UniProt	O76015	n/a
RefSeq (mRNA)	NM_006771	n/a
RefSeq (protein)	NP_006762	n/a
Location (UCSC)	Chr 17: 41.44 – 41.44 Mb	n/a
PubMed search		n/a
- Wikidata
View/Edit Human

KRT38 is a keratin gene. Its corresponding protein is asymmetrically distributed within human hair follicles. It does not have murine or equine orthologs. The encoded protein is a type I keratin and a hair keratin.
