= Keratin 34 =

Protein found in humans

KRT34

Identifiers
- Aliases: KRT34, HA4, Ha-4, KRTHA4, hHa4, Keratin 34, K34
- External IDs: OMIM: 602763; MGI: 1309994; GeneCards: KRT34

Gene location (Human)
Chr.	Chromosome 17 (human)
Band	17q21.2	Start	41,377,669 bp
Band	17q21.2	End	41,382,306 bp

Gene location (Mouse)
Chr.	Chromosome 11 (mouse)
Band	11 D|11 63.38 cM	Start	99,928,173 bp
Band	11 D|11 63.38 cM	End	99,932,380 bp
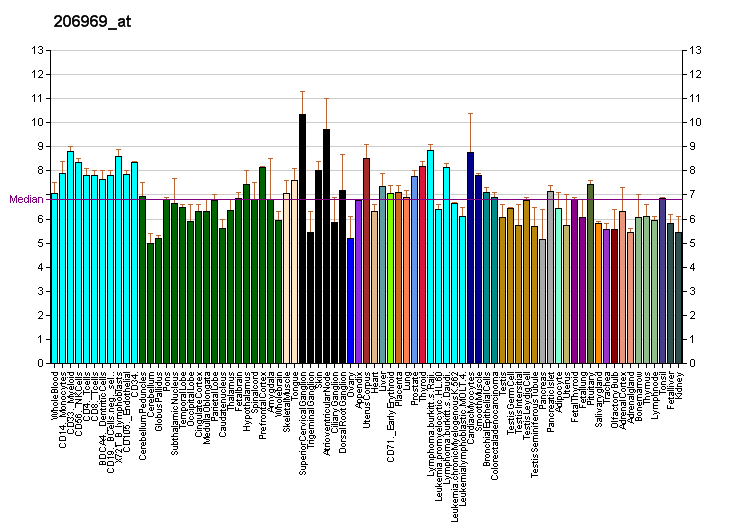
RNA expression pattern
Bgee	Human / Mouse (ortholog); Top expressed in: testicle; stromal cell of endometrium; placenta; skin of abdomen; ectocervix; skin of leg; vagina; canal of the cervix; right lung; mucosa of esophagus / Top expressed in: lip; skin of back; hair follicle; skin of abdomen; dermis; skin of external ear; sexually immature organism; conjunctival fornix; medial head of gastrocnemius muscle; foregut; More reference expression data
BioGPS	More reference expression data
Gene ontology
Molecular function	structural molecule activity
Cellular component	intermediate filament; extracellular exosome; extracellular space; cytosol
Biological process	epidermis development; keratinization; cornification
Sources:Amigo / QuickGO
Orthologs
Databases	NCBI: entry; OMA: entry
Species	Human	Mouse
Entrez	3885	16672
Ensembl	ENSG00000131737; ENSG00000262045	ENSMUSG00000043485
UniProt	O76011	Q9D646
RefSeq (mRNA)	NM_021013; NM_001386014	NM_027563
RefSeq (protein)	NP_066293	NP_081839
Location (UCSC)	Chr 17: 41.38 – 41.38 Mb	Chr 11: 99.93 – 99.93 Mb
PubMed search
- Wikidata
View/Edit Human	View/Edit Mouse

Keratin, type I cuticular Ha4 is a protein that in humans is encoded by the KRT34 gene.

The protein encoded by this gene is a member of the keratin gene family. As a type I hair keratin, it is an acidic protein which heterodimerizes with type II keratins to form hair and nails. The type I hair keratins are clustered in a region of chromosome 17q21.2 and have the same direction of transcription.

== See also ==
- 34βE12 (keratin 903)
