= KRT35 =

Protein-coding gene in the species Homo sapiens

Identifiers
- Aliases: KRT35, HA5, Ha-5, KRTHA5, hHa5, keratin 35, K35
- External IDs: OMIM: 602764; MGI: 1858899; GeneCards: KRT35

Gene location (Human)
Chr.	Chromosome 17 (human)
Band	17q21.2	Start	41,476,710 bp
Band	17q21.2	End	41,481,151 bp

Gene location (Mouse)
Chr.	Chromosome 11 (mouse)
Band	11|11 D	Start	99,983,019 bp
Band	11|11 D	End	99,987,067 bp
RNA expression pattern
Bgee	Human / Mouse (ortholog); Top expressed in: skin of arm; hair follicle; skin of leg; nipple; skin of abdomen; skin of hip; mucosa of esophagus; human musculoskeletal system; muscular system; muscle / Top expressed in: hair follicle; lip; skin of back; tongue; skin of abdomen; sexually immature organism; filiform papilla; skin of external ear; dermis; tracheobronchial tree; More reference expression data
BioGPS	n/a
Gene ontology
Molecular function	structural molecule activity
Cellular component	intermediate filament; extracellular exosome; extracellular space; cytosol
Biological process	anatomical structure morphogenesis; keratinization; cornification
Sources:Amigo / QuickGO
Orthologs
Databases	NCBI: entry; OMA: entry
Species	Human	Mouse
Entrez	3886	53617
Ensembl	ENSG00000197079	ENSMUSG00000048013
UniProt	Q92764	Q497I4
RefSeq (mRNA)	NM_002280	NM_016880
RefSeq (protein)	NP_002271	NP_058576
Location (UCSC)	Chr 17: 41.48 – 41.48 Mb	Chr 11: 99.98 – 99.99 Mb
PubMed search
- Wikidata
View/Edit Human	View/Edit Mouse

Keratin, type I cuticular Ha5 is a keratin protein that in humans is encoded by the KRT35 gene. The protein is a type I keratin and a hair keratin.
