= KRT40 =

Keratin gene

Identifiers
- Aliases: KRT40, CK-40, K40, KA36, keratin 40
- External IDs: OMIM: 616679; MGI: 3629968; GeneCards: KRT40

Gene location (Human)
Chr.	Chromosome 17 (human)
Band	17q21.2	Start	40,977,715 bp
Band	17q21.2	End	40,987,135 bp

Gene location (Mouse)
Chr.	Chromosome 11 (mouse)
Band	11 D|11	Start	99,428,311 bp
Band	11 D|11	End	99,433,984 bp
RNA expression pattern
Bgee	Human / Mouse (ortholog); Top expressed in: testicle; islet of Langerhans; anterior pituitary; olfactory zone of nasal mucosa; skin of abdomen; mucosa of transverse colon; duodenum; skin of leg; salivary gland; minor salivary glands / Top expressed in: lip; lens; zone of skin; More reference expression data
BioGPS	n/a
Gene ontology
Molecular function	protein binding; structural molecule activity
Cellular component	intermediate filament; cytosol
Biological process	keratinization; cornification
Sources:Amigo / QuickGO
Orthologs
Databases	NCBI: entry; OMA: entry
Species	Human	Mouse
Entrez	125115	406221
Ensembl	ENSG00000262845; ENSG00000204889	ENSMUSG00000059169
UniProt	Q6A162	Q6IFX3
RefSeq (mRNA)	NM_182497; NM_001385217; NM_001389244	NM_001039666; NM_001317213
RefSeq (protein)	NP_872303	NP_001034755; NP_001304142
Location (UCSC)	Chr 17: 40.98 – 40.99 Mb	Chr 11: 99.43 – 99.43 Mb
PubMed search
- Wikidata
View/Edit Human	View/Edit Mouse

KRT40 is a keratin gene that encodes for keratin40, a type I keratin expressed in the kidney.
