= KRT39 =

Protein-coding gene in the species Homo sapiens

Identifiers
- Aliases: KRT39, CK-39, K39, KA35, keratin 39
- External IDs: OMIM: 616678; MGI: 3588208; GeneCards: KRT39

Gene location (Human)
Chr.	Chromosome 17 (human)
Band	17q21.2	Start	40,958,417 bp
Band	17q21.2	End	40,966,948 bp

Gene location (Mouse)
Chr.	Chromosome 11 (mouse)
Band	11|11 D	Start	99,404,940 bp
Band	11|11 D	End	99,412,164 bp
RNA expression pattern
Bgee	Human / Mouse (ortholog); Top expressed in: testicle; skin of abdomen; gallbladder; skin of leg; mucosa of transverse colon; olfactory zone of nasal mucosa; islet of Langerhans; placenta; duodenum; right lung / Top expressed in: lip; skin of abdomen; skin of back; hair follicle; tail of embryo; dermis; skin of external ear; spermatid; pituitary gland; triceps brachii muscle; More reference expression data
BioGPS	n/a
Gene ontology
Molecular function	structural molecule activity
Cellular component	intermediate filament; cytosol
Biological process	keratinization; cornification
Sources:Amigo / QuickGO
Orthologs
Databases	NCBI: entry; OMA: entry
Species	Human	Mouse
Entrez	390792	237934
Ensembl	ENSG00000196859; ENSG00000262164	ENSMUSG00000064165
UniProt	Q6A163	Q6IFX4
RefSeq (mRNA)	NM_213656	NM_213730
RefSeq (protein)	NP_998821	NP_998895
Location (UCSC)	Chr 17: 40.96 – 40.97 Mb	Chr 11: 99.4 – 99.41 Mb
PubMed search
- Wikidata
View/Edit Human	View/Edit Mouse

KRT39 is a keratin gene. The encoded protein is a type I keratin.
