= KRT25 =

Protein-coding gene in the species Homo sapiens

Identifiers
- Aliases: KRT25, KRT25A, ARWH3, KRT24IRS1, keratin 25
- External IDs: OMIM: 616646; MGI: 1918060; GeneCards: KRT25

Gene location (Human)
Chr.	Chromosome 17 (human)
Band	17q21.2	Start	40,748,021 bp
Band	17q21.2	End	40,755,331 bp

Gene location (Mouse)
Chr.	Chromosome 11 (mouse)
Band	11|11 D	Start	99,206,342 bp
Band	11|11 D	End	99,213,777 bp
RNA expression pattern
Bgee	Human / Mouse (ortholog); Top expressed in: skin of arm; skin of hip; testicle; sperm; nipple; gonad; tibialis anterior muscle; skin of thigh; deltoid muscle; skin of abdomen / Top expressed in: hair follicle; lip; skin of back; sexually immature organism; skin of external ear; skin of abdomen; primary oocyte; secondary oocyte; zygote; cerebellum; More reference expression data
BioGPS	n/a
Gene ontology
Molecular function	structural molecule activity; protein heterodimerization activity; molecular function
Cellular component	cytoplasm; extracellular exosome; intermediate filament; cytosol
Biological process	hair cycle; hair follicle morphogenesis; intermediate filament organization; ageing; cytoskeleton organization; keratinization; cornification
Sources:Amigo / QuickGO
Orthologs
Databases	NCBI: entry; OMA: entry
Species	Human	Mouse
Entrez	147183	70810
Ensembl	ENSG00000204897	ENSMUSG00000035831
UniProt	Q7Z3Z0	Q8VCW2
RefSeq (mRNA)	NM_181534	NM_133730
RefSeq (protein)	NP_853512	NP_598491
Location (UCSC)	Chr 17: 40.75 – 40.76 Mb	Chr 11: 99.21 – 99.21 Mb
PubMed search
- Wikidata
View/Edit Human	View/Edit Mouse

KRT25 (full name keratin 25) is a gene encoding for a protein in the type I keratin family. The gene is encoded on a region of chromosome 17q21.2.
