= KRT28 =

Protein-coding gene in the species Homo sapiens

Identifiers
- Aliases: KRT28, KRT25D, K25IRS4, keratin 28
- External IDs: OMIM: 616677; MGI: 1918093; GeneCards: KRT28

Gene location (Human)
Chr.	Chromosome 17 (human)
Band	17q21.2	Start	40,792,196 bp
Band	17q21.2	End	40,799,959 bp

Gene location (Mouse)
Chr.	Chromosome 11 (mouse)
Band	11|11 D	Start	99,255,698 bp
Band	11|11 D	End	99,265,729 bp
RNA expression pattern
Bgee	Human / Mouse (ortholog); Top expressed in: testicle; gonad; skin of abdomen; skin of leg; human musculoskeletal system; skeletal muscle; lower limb muscles; muscle of leg; gastrocnemius muscle; tibial nerve / Top expressed in: hair follicle; lip; skin of abdomen; skin of back; blastocyst; lumbar spinal ganglion; morula; embryo; embryo; sexually immature organism; More reference expression data
BioGPS	n/a
Gene ontology
Molecular function	structural molecule activity; molecular function
Cellular component	cytoplasm; extracellular exosome; intermediate filament; cytosol
Biological process	keratinization; cornification; biological process
Sources:Amigo / QuickGO
Orthologs
Databases	NCBI: entry; OMA: entry
Species	Human	Mouse
Entrez	162605	70843
Ensembl	ENSG00000173908	ENSMUSG00000055937
UniProt	Q7Z3Y7	A6BLY7
RefSeq (mRNA)	NM_181535	NM_027574
RefSeq (protein)	NP_853513	NP_081850
Location (UCSC)	Chr 17: 40.79 – 40.8 Mb	Chr 11: 99.26 – 99.27 Mb
PubMed search
- Wikidata
View/Edit Human	View/Edit Mouse

KRT28 is a keratin gene.
