= KRT80 =

Protein-coding gene in Homo sapiens

Identifiers
- Aliases: KRT80, KB20, keratin 80
- External IDs: OMIM: 611161; MGI: 1921377; GeneCards: KRT80

Gene location (Human)
Chr.	Chromosome 12 (human)
Band	12q13.13	Start	52,168,996 bp
Band	12q13.13	End	52,192,014 bp

Gene location (Mouse)
Chr.	Chromosome 15 (mouse)
Band	15 F1|15	Start	101,245,325 bp
Band	15 F1|15	End	101,268,043 bp
RNA expression pattern
Bgee	Human / Mouse (ortholog); Top expressed in: skin of abdomen; skin of arm; skin of leg; skin of thigh; amniotic fluid; skin of hip; gums; gingival epithelium; vulva; human penis / Top expressed in: lip; esophagus; skin of external ear; skin of back; right lung; granulocyte; right lung lobe; molar; external naris; conjunctival fornix; More reference expression data
BioGPS	n/a
Gene ontology
Molecular function	protein binding; structural molecule activity
Cellular component	cytoplasm; desmosome; keratin filament; intermediate filament; cytosol; intermediate filament cytoskeleton
Biological process	keratinization; cornification
Sources:Amigo / QuickGO
Orthologs
Databases	NCBI: entry; OMA: entry
Species	Human	Mouse
Entrez	144501	74127
Ensembl	ENSG00000167767	ENSMUSG00000037185
UniProt	Q6KB66	Q0VBK2
RefSeq (mRNA)	NM_001081492; NM_182507	NM_028770
RefSeq (protein)	NP_001074961; NP_872313	NP_083046
Location (UCSC)	Chr 12: 52.17 – 52.19 Mb	Chr 15: 101.25 – 101.27 Mb
PubMed search
- Wikidata
View/Edit Human	View/Edit Mouse

Keratin 80, also known as KRT80, is a protein which in humans is encoded by the KRT80 gene.

== Function ==
Keratins, such as KRT80, are filament proteins that make up one of the major structural fibers of epithelial cells.
