= KRT76 =

Gene

Identifiers
- Aliases: KRT76, HUMCYT2A, KRT2B, KRT2P, keratin 76
- External IDs: OMIM: 616671; MGI: 1924305; GeneCards: KRT76

Gene location (Human)
Chr.	Chromosome 12 (human)
Band	12q13.13	Start	52,768,155 bp
Band	12q13.13	End	52,777,345 bp

Gene location (Mouse)
Chr.	Chromosome 15 (mouse)
Band	15|15 F2	Start	101,792,786 bp
Band	15|15 F2	End	101,801,355 bp
RNA expression pattern
Bgee	Human / Mouse (ortholog); Top expressed in: gums; gingival epithelium; body of tongue; superior surface of tongue; cervix epithelium; pharynx; tonsil; mucosa of esophagus; apex of heart; exocrine gland / Top expressed in: embryo; molar; esophagus; zygote; oocyte; secondary oocyte; primary oocyte; lip; sexually immature organism; blood; More reference expression data
BioGPS	n/a
Gene ontology
Molecular function	structural molecule activity
Cellular component	keratin filament; intermediate filament; extracellular exosome; nucleus; cytosol
Biological process	sebaceous gland development; cytoskeleton organization; epidermis development; keratinization; pigmentation; cornification
Sources:Amigo / QuickGO
Orthologs
Databases	NCBI: entry; OMA: entry
Species	Human	Mouse
Entrez	51350	77055
Ensembl	ENSG00000185069	ENSMUSG00000075402
UniProt	Q01546	Q3UV17
RefSeq (mRNA)	NM_015848	NM_001033177
RefSeq (protein)	NP_056932	NP_001028349
Location (UCSC)	Chr 12: 52.77 – 52.78 Mb	Chr 15: 101.79 – 101.8 Mb
PubMed search
- Wikidata
View/Edit Human	View/Edit Mouse

Keratin, type II cytoskeletal 2 oral is a protein that in humans is encoded by the KRT76 gene. Loss of this gene's expression or downregulation of the gene is associated with oral cancer.
