= KRT79 =

Structural protein

Identifiers
- Aliases: KRT79, K6L, KRT6L, keratin 79
- External IDs: OMIM: 611160; MGI: 2385030; GeneCards: KRT79

Gene location (Human)
Chr.	Chromosome 12 (human)
Band	12q13.13	Start	52,821,408 bp
Band	12q13.13	End	52,834,311 bp

Gene location (Mouse)
Chr.	Chromosome 15 (mouse)
Band	15|15 F2	Start	101,837,767 bp
Band	15|15 F2	End	101,848,759 bp
RNA expression pattern
Bgee	Human / Mouse (ortholog); Top expressed in: skin of thigh; vulva; skin of abdomen; nipple; subcutaneous adipose tissue; mammary gland; lactiferous gland; upper lobe of left lung; right lung; islet of Langerhans / Top expressed in: lip; skin of external ear; skin of back; right lung lobe; mucous cell of stomach; skin of abdomen; sexually immature organism; epidermis; conjunctival fornix; embryo; More reference expression data
BioGPS	n/a
Gene ontology
Molecular function	enzyme binding; protein binding; structural molecule activity
Cellular component	keratin filament; extracellular exosome; intermediate filament; cytosol
Biological process	keratinization; cornification
Sources:Amigo / QuickGO
Orthologs
Databases	NCBI: entry; OMA: entry
Species	Human	Mouse
Entrez	338785	223917
Ensembl	ENSG00000185640	ENSMUSG00000061397
UniProt	Q5XKE5	Q8VED5
RefSeq (mRNA)	NM_175834	NM_146063
RefSeq (protein)	NP_787028	NP_666175
Location (UCSC)	Chr 12: 52.82 – 52.83 Mb	Chr 15: 101.84 – 101.85 Mb
PubMed search
- Wikidata
View/Edit Human	View/Edit Mouse

Keratin 79 also known as KRT79 is a protein which humans is encoded by the KRT79 gene.

== Function ==
Keratins, such as KRT79, are filament proteins that make up one of the major structural fibers of epithelial cells
