= KRT74 =

Protein-coding gene in humans

Identifiers
- Aliases: KRT74, ADWH, HTSS2, HYPT3, K6IRS4, KRT5C, KRT6IRS4, keratin 74
- External IDs: OMIM: 608248; GeneCards: KRT74

Gene location (Human)
Chr.	Chromosome 12 (human)
Band	12q13.13	Start	52,565,782 bp
Band	12q13.13	End	52,573,843 bp
RNA expression pattern
Bgee	Human / Mouse (ortholog); Top expressed in: skin of arm; testicle; skin of hip; nipple; corpus epididymis; skin of abdomen; skin of leg; spinal cord; C1 segment; granulocyte / n/a; More reference expression data
BioGPS	n/a
Gene ontology
Molecular function	keratin filament binding; structural molecule activity
Cellular component	cytoplasm; extracellular exosome; keratin filament; intermediate filament; cytosol
Biological process	intermediate filament cytoskeleton organization; keratinization; cornification
Sources:Amigo / QuickGO
Orthologs
Databases	NCBI: entry; OMA: entry
Species	Human	Mouse
Entrez	121391	n/a
Ensembl	ENSG00000170484	n/a
UniProt	Q7RTS7	n/a
RefSeq (mRNA)	NM_175053	n/a
RefSeq (protein)	NP_778223	n/a
Location (UCSC)	Chr 12: 52.57 – 52.57 Mb	n/a
PubMed search		n/a
- Wikidata
View/Edit Human

Keratin, type II cytoskeletal 74 is a protein that in humans is encoded by the KRT74 gene.

Mutations in KRT74 cause hair and nail ectodermal dysplasia.
