= KRT73 =

Protein-coding gene in humans

Identifiers
- Aliases: KRT73, IRT6IRS3, K6IRS3, KRT6IRS3, keratin 73, K73, CK-73
- External IDs: OMIM: 608247; MGI: 3607712; GeneCards: KRT73

Gene location (Human)
Chr.	Chromosome 12 (human)
Band	12q13.13	Start	52,607,570 bp
Band	12q13.13	End	52,618,559 bp

Gene location (Mouse)
Chr.	Chromosome 15 (mouse)
Band	15|15 F2	Start	101,701,743 bp
Band	15|15 F2	End	101,710,781 bp
RNA expression pattern
Bgee	Human / Mouse (ortholog); Top expressed in: skin of leg; skin of abdomen; granulocyte; gonad; blood; lymph node; appendix; duodenum; spleen; bone marrow / Top expressed in: hair follicle; lip; skin of abdomen; skin of back; zygote; sexually immature organism; oocyte; primary oocyte; lumbar subsegment of spinal cord; embryo; More reference expression data
BioGPS	n/a
Gene ontology
Molecular function	protein binding; structural molecule activity; molecular function
Cellular component	keratin filament; extracellular exosome; intermediate filament; nucleus; cytosol
Biological process	keratinization; cornification; biological process
Sources:Amigo / QuickGO
Orthologs
Databases	NCBI: entry; OMA: entry
Species	Human	Mouse
Entrez	319101	223915
Ensembl	ENSG00000186049	ENSMUSG00000063661
UniProt	Q86Y46	Q6NXH9
RefSeq (mRNA)	NM_175068	NM_212485
RefSeq (protein)	NP_778238	NP_997650
Location (UCSC)	Chr 12: 52.61 – 52.62 Mb	Chr 15: 101.7 – 101.71 Mb
PubMed search
- Wikidata
View/Edit Human	View/Edit Mouse

Keratin, type II cytoskeletal 73 is a protein that in humans is encoded by the KRT73 gene. It is responsible for hair formation, along with other genes, and it encodes a protein present in the inner root sheath of hair follicles.
