= KRT126P =

Pseudogene in the species Homo sapiens

Identifiers
- Aliases: KRT126P, KRT, keratin 126 pseudogene, keratin 126, pseudogene
- External IDs: GeneCards: KRT126P; OMA:KRT126P - orthologs
Orthologs
Species	Human	Mouse
Entrez	643865	n/a
Ensembl	ENSG00000257402	n/a
UniProt	n a	n/a
RefSeq (mRNA)	n/a	n/a
RefSeq (protein)	n/a	n/a
Location (UCSC)	n/a	n/a
PubMed search		n/a
- Wikidata
View/Edit Human

Keratin 126 pseudogene is a protein that in humans is encoded by the KRT126P gene.
