= KRT26 =

Gene

Identifiers
- Aliases: KRT26, CK26, K25IRS2, K26, KRT25B, K25, keratin 26, K25B
- External IDs: OMIM: 616675; MGI: 2444913; GeneCards: KRT26

Gene location (Human)
Chr.	Chromosome 17 (human)
Band	17q21.2	Start	40,766,238 bp
Band	17q21.2	End	40,772,162 bp

Gene location (Mouse)
Chr.	Chromosome 11 (mouse)
Band	11|11 D	Start	99,219,376 bp
Band	11|11 D	End	99,228,792 bp
RNA expression pattern
Bgee	Human / Mouse (ortholog); Top expressed in: testicle; gonad; skin of abdomen; skin of leg; right testis; left testis; tibial nerve; subcutaneous adipose tissue / Top expressed in: hair follicle; lip; skin of abdomen; skin of back; sexually immature organism; sensory ganglion; skin of external ear; trigeminal ganglion; temporal muscle; cerebellar cortex; More reference expression data
BioGPS	n/a
Gene ontology
Molecular function	structural molecule activity
Cellular component	intermediate filament; extracellular exosome; cytosol
Biological process	keratinization; cornification
Sources:Amigo / QuickGO
Orthologs
Databases	NCBI: entry; OMA: entry
Species	Human	Mouse
Entrez	353288	320864
Ensembl	ENSG00000186393	ENSMUSG00000075570
UniProt	Q7Z3Y9	Q3TRJ4
RefSeq (mRNA)	NM_181539	NM_001033397
RefSeq (protein)	NP_853517	NP_001028569
Location (UCSC)	Chr 17: 40.77 – 40.77 Mb	Chr 11: 99.22 – 99.23 Mb
PubMed search
- Wikidata
View/Edit Human	View/Edit Mouse

KRT26 is a keratin gene.
