= KRT24 =

Protein-coding gene in the species Homo sapiens

Identifiers
- Aliases: KRT24, K24, KA24, keratin 24
- External IDs: OMIM: 607742; MGI: 1922956; GeneCards: KRT24

Gene location (Human)
Chr.	Chromosome 17 (human)
Band	17q21.2	Start	40,697,991 bp
Band	17q21.2	End	40,703,752 bp

Gene location (Mouse)
Chr.	Chromosome 11 (mouse)
Band	11|11 D	Start	99,170,785 bp
Band	11|11 D	End	99,176,088 bp
RNA expression pattern
Bgee	Human / Mouse (ortholog); Top expressed in: amniotic fluid; gonad; tail of epididymis; mucosa of pharynx; buccal mucosa cell; corpus epididymis; mucosa of esophagus; periodontal fiber; nasal epithelium; testicle / Top expressed in: skin of external ear; lip; interventricular septum; molar; skin of back; soleus muscle; knee joint; triceps brachii muscle; ciliary body; endothelial cell of lymphatic vessel; More reference expression data
BioGPS	n/a
Gene ontology
Molecular function	structural molecule activity; molecular function
Cellular component	extracellular exosome; intermediate filament; cytosol
Biological process	keratinization; cornification; biological process
Sources:Amigo / QuickGO
Orthologs
Databases	NCBI: entry; OMA: entry
Species	Human	Mouse
Entrez	192666	75706
Ensembl	ENSG00000167916	ENSMUSG00000020913
UniProt	Q2M2I5	A1L317
RefSeq (mRNA)	NM_019016	NM_029393
RefSeq (protein)	NP_061889	NP_083669
Location (UCSC)	Chr 17: 40.7 – 40.7 Mb	Chr 11: 99.17 – 99.18 Mb
PubMed search
- Wikidata
View/Edit Human	View/Edit Mouse

KRT24 is a keratin gene that also influences cellular responses to apoptotic signals. It produces a cytokeratin-like protein of 525 amino acids.
