= KRT72 =

Protein-coding gene in humans

Identifiers
- Aliases: KRT72, K6IRS2, K6irs, KRT6, KRT6IRS2, keratin 72, K72, CK-72
- External IDs: OMIM: 608246; MGI: 2146034; GeneCards: KRT72

Gene location (Human)
Chr.	Chromosome 12 (human)
Band	12q13.13	Start	52,585,589 bp
Band	12q13.13	End	52,601,538 bp

Gene location (Mouse)
Chr.	Chromosome 15 (mouse)
Band	15|15 F2	Start	101,684,607 bp
Band	15|15 F2	End	101,694,895 bp
RNA expression pattern
Bgee	Human / Mouse (ortholog); Top expressed in: granulocyte; left testis; right testis; skin of leg; skin of abdomen; blood; lymph node; gonad; spleen; appendix / Top expressed in: lip; hair follicle; skin of back; skin of abdomen; secondary oocyte; primary oocyte; entorhinal cortex; zygote; primary motor cortex; embryo; More reference expression data
BioGPS	n/a
Gene ontology
Molecular function	protein binding; structural molecule activity; molecular function
Cellular component	intermediate filament; extracellular exosome; keratin filament; cytosol
Biological process	keratinization; cornification; biological process
Sources:Amigo / QuickGO
Orthologs
Databases	NCBI: entry; OMA: entry
Species	Human	Mouse
Entrez	140807	105866
Ensembl	ENSG00000170486	ENSMUSG00000056605
UniProt	Q14CN4	Q6IME9
RefSeq (mRNA)	NM_001146225; NM_001146226; NM_080747	NM_213728
RefSeq (protein)	NP_001139697; NP_001139698; NP_542785	NP_998893
Location (UCSC)	Chr 12: 52.59 – 52.6 Mb	Chr 15: 101.68 – 101.69 Mb
PubMed search
- Wikidata
View/Edit Human	View/Edit Mouse

Keratin, type II cytoskeletal 72 is a protein that in humans is encoded by the KRT72 gene. It is responsible for hair formation, and it encodes a protein present in the inner root sheath of hair follicles.
