= KRT32 =

Protein-coding gene in the species Homo sapiens

Identifiers
- Aliases: KRT32, HA2, HKA2, KRTHA2, hHa2, keratin 32
- External IDs: OMIM: 602760; MGI: 1309995; GeneCards: KRT32

Gene location (Human)
Chr.	Chromosome 17 (human)
Band	17q21.2	Start	41,459,513 bp
Band	17q21.2	End	41,467,386 bp

Gene location (Mouse)
Chr.	Chromosome 11 (mouse)
Band	11 D|11 63.4 cM	Start	99,971,674 bp
Band	11 D|11 63.4 cM	End	99,979,052 bp
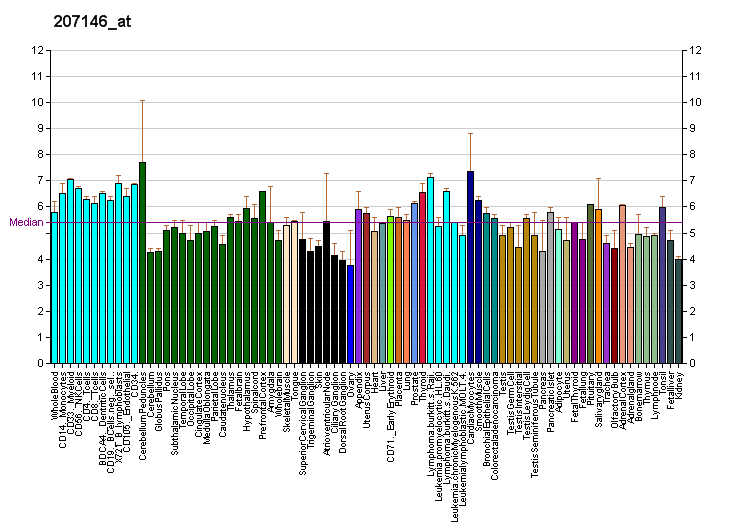
RNA expression pattern
Bgee	Human / Mouse (ortholog); Top expressed in: hair follicle; skin of arm; periodontal fiber; nipple; human penis; skin of abdomen; skin of leg; vagina; pharynx; cervix / Top expressed in: lip; esophagus; superior surface of tongue; hair follicle; Ileal epithelium; skin of back; morula; urethra; skin of abdomen; extensor digitorum longus muscle; More reference expression data
BioGPS	More reference expression data
Gene ontology
Molecular function	structural molecule activity
Cellular component	intermediate filament; extracellular exosome; cytosol
Biological process	epidermis development; keratinization; cornification
Sources:Amigo / QuickGO
Orthologs
Databases	NCBI: entry; OMA: entry
Species	Human	Mouse
Entrez	3882	16670
Ensembl	ENSG00000108759	ENSMUSG00000046095
UniProt	Q14532	Q62168
RefSeq (mRNA)	NM_002278	NM_001159374; NM_010665
RefSeq (protein)	NP_002269	NP_001152846
Location (UCSC)	Chr 17: 41.46 – 41.47 Mb	Chr 11: 99.97 – 99.98 Mb
PubMed search
- Wikidata
View/Edit Human	View/Edit Mouse

Keratin, type I cuticular Ha2 is a protein that in humans is encoded by the KRT32 gene.

The protein encoded by this gene is a member of the keratin gene family. As a type I hair keratin, it is an acidic protein which heterodimerizes with type II hair keratin to form hair and nails. The type I hair keratins are clustered in a region of chromosome 17q21.2 and have the same direction of transcription.
