= KRT78 =

Protein-coding gene in the species Homo sapiens

Identifiers
- Aliases: KRT78, CK-78, K5B, K78, Kb40, keratin 78
- External IDs: OMIM: 611159; MGI: 1917529; GeneCards: KRT78

Gene location (Human)
Chr.	Chromosome 12 (human)
Band	12q13.13	Start	52,837,804 bp
Band	12q13.13	End	52,849,092 bp

Gene location (Mouse)
Chr.	Chromosome 15 (mouse)
Band	15|15 F2	Start	101,854,436 bp
Band	15|15 F2	End	101,862,722 bp
RNA expression pattern
Bgee	Human / Mouse (ortholog); Top expressed in: buccal mucosa cell; oral cavity; mucosa of pharynx; amniotic fluid; skin of leg; body of tongue; gums; skin of abdomen; gingival epithelium; testicle / Top expressed in: esophagus; lip; skin of external ear; condyle; conjunctival fornix; fossa; stomach; skin of back; cornea; molar; More reference expression data
BioGPS	n/a
Gene ontology
Molecular function	structural molecule activity
Cellular component	intermediate filament; keratin filament; extracellular exosome; extracellular space; cytosol
Biological process	keratinization; cornification
Sources:Amigo / QuickGO
Orthologs
Databases	NCBI: entry; OMA: entry
Species	Human	Mouse
Entrez	196374	332131
Ensembl	ENSG00000170423	ENSMUSG00000050463
UniProt	Q8N1N4	n/a
RefSeq (mRNA)	NM_001300814; NM_173352	NM_212487
RefSeq (protein)	NP_001287743; NP_775487	n/a
Location (UCSC)	Chr 12: 52.84 – 52.85 Mb	Chr 15: 101.85 – 101.86 Mb
PubMed search
- Wikidata
View/Edit Human	View/Edit Mouse

Keratin, type II cytoskeletal 78 is a protein that in humans is encoded by the KRT78 gene.

This gene is a member of the type II keratin gene family and encodes a protein with an intermediate filament domain. Keratins are the major structural proteins in epithelial cells, forming a cytoplasmic network of 10 to 12 nm wide intermediate filaments and creating a scaffold that gives cells the ability to withstand mechanical and non-mechanical stresses. The genes of the type II keratin family are located as a gene cluster at 12p13.13. Four pseudogenes of this gene family have been identified.
