= Keratin 1 =

Protein found in humans

KRT1

Identifiers
- Aliases: KRT1, CK1, EHK, EHK1, EPPK, K1, KRT1A, NEPPK, keratin 1
- External IDs: OMIM: 139350; MGI: 96698; GeneCards: KRT1
Available structures
PDB	Ortholog search: PDBe RCSB
PDB	List of PDB id codes 4ZRY

Gene location (Human)
Chr.	Chromosome 12 (human)
Band	12q13.13	Start	52,674,736 bp
Band	12q13.13	End	52,680,407 bp

Gene location (Mouse)
Chr.	Chromosome 15 (mouse)
Band	15 F2|15 57.06 cM	Start	101,753,861 bp
Band	15 F2|15 57.06 cM	End	101,759,229 bp
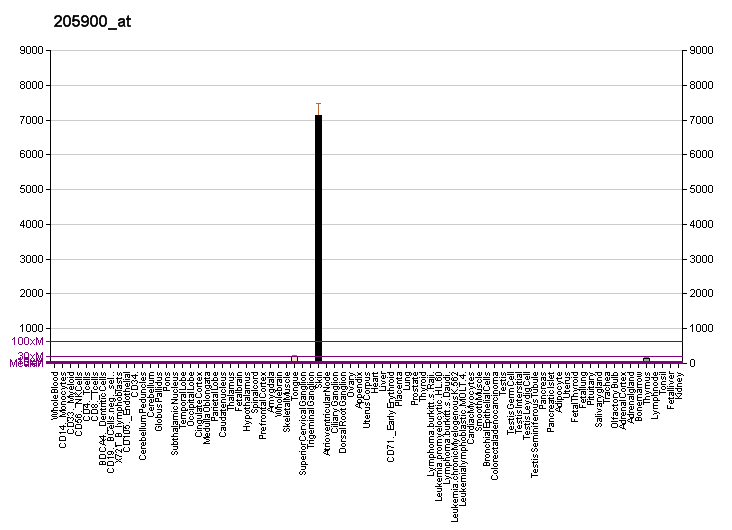
RNA expression pattern
Bgee	Human / Mouse (ortholog); Top expressed in: skin of thigh; vulva; skin of arm; skin of hip; human penis; nipple; skin of abdomen; cervix epithelium; gums; gingival epithelium / Top expressed in: lip; condyle; umbilical cord; skin of external ear; skin of abdomen; human fetus; skin of back; fossa; sexually immature organism; cervix; More reference expression data
BioGPS	More reference expression data
Gene ontology
Molecular function	protein binding; structural molecule activity; carbohydrate binding; structural constituent of skin epidermis; signaling receptor activity; protein heterodimerization activity
Cellular component	intermediate filament; extracellular matrix; blood microparticle; plasma membrane; keratin filament; cytoskeleton; membrane; nucleus; extracellular exosome; extracellular region; extracellular space; cytosol; ficolin-1-rich granule lumen; cornified envelope; collagen-containing extracellular matrix
Biological process	complement activation, lectin pathway; retina homeostasis; regulation of angiogenesis; negative regulation of inflammatory response; response to oxidative stress; fibrinolysis; establishment of skin barrier; keratinization; neutrophil degranulation; cornification; peptide cross-linking; protein heterotetramerization
Sources:Amigo / QuickGO
Orthologs
Databases	NCBI: entry; OMA: entry
Species	Human	Mouse
Entrez	3848	16678
Ensembl	ENSG00000167768	ENSMUSG00000046834
UniProt	P04264	P04104
RefSeq (mRNA)	NM_006121	NM_008473
RefSeq (protein)	NP_006112	NP_032499
Location (UCSC)	Chr 12: 52.67 – 52.68 Mb	Chr 15: 101.75 – 101.76 Mb
PubMed search
- Wikidata
View/Edit Human	View/Edit Mouse

Keratin 1 (K1) is a Type II intermediate filament (IFs) of the intracytoplasmatic cytoskeleton. It is co-expressed with and binds to Keratin 10, a Type I keratin, to form a coiled coil heterotypic keratin chain which then combine to constitute intermediate filaments. Keratin 1 and Keratin 10 are specifically expressed in the spinous and granular layers of the epidermis. Here, they are involved in both developing a physical barrier and various immune functions. Mutation of the protein causes forms of bullous congenital ichthyosiform erythroderma, and over expression is related to various cancers as it acts as a tumor-associated marker.

== Structure ==
Keratin 1 is a type of fibrous protein of the keratin family and is primarily involved in the formation of rope-like intermediate filaments. More specifically, it is a Type II intermediate filament, meaning it has a generally larger and neutral-basic structure compared to the small and acidic Type I counterparts. The rod-like structure of K1 consists of a coiled-coil central domain, which is surrounded by flexible, glycine-rich loops at the terminal ends. In all, K1 consists of 644 amino acids (aa) with the internal central domain consisting of four coiled segments made up of 313 amino acids, the 180 aa N-terminal head, and 151 aa C-terminal tail. These tail regions, rich in glycine loops, are known to assist in the assembly of mature intermediate filaments via head-to-tail attachment of K1 units. Additionally, low-complexity aromatic-rich kinked segments (LARKS), found at the tail ends, take on a β-sheet structure, which further assists in this head-to-tail linkage.

Type II cytokeratins, like K1, are clustered in a region of chromosome 12q13.13. Specifically, Keratin 1 is generated from the KRT1 gene. The protein has a molecular weight of roughly 66 kDa and an isoelectric point of roughly 8.3, further confirming that the protein is basic.

Keratin 1 often dimerizes with Keratin 10 to create a parallel heterodimer in a process driven by hydrophobic interactions. However, polarization of charges between the coils and acid-base interactions also play a role. The dimers have three general structural components: a basic N-terminus, an acidic shaft, and an acidic C-terminus. Primarily due to hydrophobic interactions, these dimers then go on to tetramerize in an antiparallel fashion, from which they can form into intermediate filament structures. Due to the antiparallel structure of the tetramers, the basic nature of the N-termini is over-powered and eliminated. Therefore, when considering the electrostatic imbalance of the dimers, the tetramer takes on an acidic overall nature. The four key structures in the tetramerization from the K1/K10 heterodimer to the K1/K10 tetramer are the K1 hydrophobic pocket, K10 hydrophobic stripe, K1 interaction residues, and K1 anchoring knob. From these structures, the most important mechanism in tetramerization is that of the K1-hydrophobic pocket enveloping and binding to the K1 anchoring knob. Overall, the intermediate filament assembly from K1 and K10 is driven mainly by hydrophobic interactions in the knob-pocket mechanism.

== Function ==
The general formation of keratin intermediate filament is as follows: a type I keratin and a type II keratin bind to create a parallel heterodimer, which then uses a matching pair to create an antiparallel tetramer with two of each type. The tetramers go on to combine into a protofibril, which then combine with other protofibrils to make the final keratin intermediate filament.

Therefore, K1, being a type II keratin protein, combined with the type I K10 serve as base units of specific intermediate filaments. This K1/K10 intermediate filament final product is a structural component of the suprabasal (spinous and granular) layer cells in the epidermis. While its most common type I pair in the epidermis is K10, in the palms and soles of the feet, it can pair with Keratin 9 (K9). The epidermis is critical in the body's integumentary system and is involved in mechanical protection, water balance, and immune homeostasis.

Regarding its role in epidermal structural stability, K1 and K10 tetramers are the primary component in the cytoskeleton on the suprabasal keratinocytes. In contrast, basal layer keratinocytes express little to no Keratin 1. More specifically, upregulation of K1 and K10 in the keratinocytes induces filaggrin and cornified envelope proteins. K1 then crosslinks with these proteins and complex lipids to form the cornified envelope. The cornified envelope is the main protective structure in the epidermis and replaces plasma membranes in keratinocytes. It is a protein layer consisting of keratins like K1, K10, and the proteins mentioned. The overall barrier of the epidermis is completed with the immune function of Langerhans cells. The importance to the skin barrier is seen in dysfunctional K1 cases, where the skin erodes and becomes blistered.

Beyond its role in providing structural toughness to the epidermis, K1 is also involved in the innate immune system of the epithelia that it is found in. It plays a role in local and systemic inflammation pathways and can even promote apoptosis in the smooth muscle of blood vessels affected with atherosclerosis. It acts as an inhibitor to the activation of the proinflammatory cytokine interleukin-18 (Il-18) in the case of an intact skin barrier. It works in tandem with Keratin 17 (K17), which induces inflammatory signaling pathways and protein synthesis in the case of a challenged skin barrier via injury, cancer, or irritants. Therefore, in a chronic or acute challenge to the skin barrier, K1 is down-regulated and K17 is up-regulated.

Last, K1 and its dimer partner, K10, are found in the sweat gland ducts of the skin. However, they are not present in any parts of a hair unit, like the follicle or the hair itself.

== Related diseases ==
With its structural properties, Keratin 1 is involved in cell growth and proliferation. Therefore, its overexpression can be used as a marker for cancer in events like tumorigenesis and apoptosis. Overexpression of K1 has been witnessed in various forms of cancer, such as triple negative breast cancer, Nasopharyngeal carcinoma, and neuroblastomas. These cancerous cells display cell-surface keratins that are modified and are likely involved in receptor-mediated endocytosis and evasion of the immune system. Therefore, current research is aiming to use this overexpressed cell-surface K1 as a receptor for targeted drug delivery in cutting-edge cancer treatment. Additionally, K1 is overexpressed in cells that are experiencing oxidative stress, meaning its overexpression could have therapy target potential in other diseases as well.

Mutations in KRT1, the gene encoding Keratin 1, have been associated with variants of the disease bullous congenital ichthyosiform erythroderma. Often, this disease presents with systemic blistered skin and then develops into thick and ichthyotic skin, due to fragmentation of the suprabasal layer where K1 is critical in the structure. Additionally, the skin becomes hyperproliferative, with rapid growth, and hyperkeratotic. Mutations in KRT10 have also been associated with bullous congenital ichthyosiform erythroderma; however, in patients with KRT10 mutations the palms and soles are spared. This difference is likely due to K9, rather than K10, being the major binding partner of K1 in acral (palm and sole) keratinocytes.

== Interactions ==
Keratin 1 has been shown to interact with desmoplakin and PRKCE.

== See also ==
- 34βE12
