= KRT77 =

Protein-coding gene in Homo sapiens

Identifiers
- Aliases: KRT77, K1B, KRT1B, keratin 77
- External IDs: OMIM: 611158; MGI: 3588209; GeneCards: KRT77

Gene location (Human)
Chr.	Chromosome 12 (human)
Band	12q13.13	Start	52,689,626 bp
Band	12q13.13	End	52,703,524 bp

Gene location (Mouse)
Chr.	Chromosome 15 (mouse)
Band	15|15 F2	Start	101,767,166 bp
Band	15|15 F2	End	101,778,140 bp
RNA expression pattern
Bgee	Human / Mouse (ortholog); Top expressed in: skin of arm; skin of thigh; nipple; skin of hip; skin of abdomen; vulva; testicle; human penis; gonad; gastrocnemius muscle / Top expressed in: skin of abdomen; skin of external ear; skin of back; lip; umbilical cord; condyle; human fetus; fossa; dentate gyrus of hippocampal formation granule cell; blastocyst; More reference expression data
BioGPS	n/a
Gene ontology
Molecular function	structural molecule activity; molecular function; protein binding
Cellular component	extracellular exosome; cytoskeleton; keratin filament; intermediate filament; cytosol
Biological process	keratinization; cornification; biological process
Sources:Amigo / QuickGO
Orthologs
Databases	NCBI: entry; OMA: entry
Species	Human	Mouse
Entrez	374454	406220
Ensembl	ENSG00000189182	ENSMUSG00000067594
UniProt	Q7Z794; Q0IIN1	Q6IFZ6
RefSeq (mRNA)	NM_175078	NM_001003667
RefSeq (protein)	NP_778253; NP_778253.2	NP_001003667
Location (UCSC)	Chr 12: 52.69 – 52.7 Mb	Chr 15: 101.77 – 101.78 Mb
PubMed search
- Wikidata
View/Edit Human	View/Edit Mouse

KRT77 encodes keratin 77, a member of the type II keratin family of intermediate filament proteins. Keratin 77 is also known as KRT1B, Type II cytoskeletal 1b, Type II keratin Kb39, and cytokeratin 1B. KRT77 is well-expressed by granular layer epidermal keratinocytes except for those that reside at acral surfaces. There is little to no expression of KRT77 in acral keratinocytes.
