= KRT41P =

Identifiers
- Aliases: KRT41P, hHaA, phihHaA, KRTHAP1, keratin 41 pseudogene, keratin 41, pseudogene
- External IDs: GeneCards: KRT41P

Gene location (Human)
Chr.	Chromosome 17 (human)
Band	17q21.2	Start	41,406,512 bp
Band	17q21.2	End	41,411,775 bp
RNA expression pattern
Bgee	Human / Mouse (ortholog); Top expressed in: skin of abdomen; skin of leg; kidney; human kidney; renal cortex; smooth muscle tissue; lactiferous gland; subcutaneous adipose tissue / n/a; More reference expression data
BioGPS	n/a
Orthologs
Databases	NCBI: entry; OMA: entry
Species	Human	Mouse
Entrez	8686	n/a
Ensembl	ENSG00000225438	n/a
UniProt	n a	n/a
RefSeq (mRNA)	n/a	n/a
RefSeq (protein)	n/a	n/a
Location (UCSC)	Chr 17: 41.41 – 41.41 Mb	n/a
PubMed search		n/a
- Wikidata
View/Edit Human

KRT41P, formerly KRTHAP1 (also known as ΨhHaA, h prefix for "human") is a human pseudogene that used to code for a keratin. It is believed to be responsible for fur-like body hair.

There is still variation in the degree of body hair among human beings and occasional examples have been found of people where the gene is active leading to very thick body hair as a result. Although the mutation was dated to 240 000 by Winter et al., it is also present in the Vindija Neandertal and Altai Denisovan sequences. Hence the dating must be older than 700 00 kya and possibly more than 1 mya considering the latter's divergence date. Given the divergence of pubic and head hair lice, the date of the mutation may be as old as 3.3 million years old.
