= KRT84 =

Protein-coding gene

Identifiers
- Aliases: KRT84, HB4, KRTHB4, keratin 84
- External IDs: OMIM: 602766; MGI: 96700; GeneCards: KRT84

Gene location (Human)
Chr.	Chromosome 12 (human)
Band	12q13.13	Start	52,377,812 bp
Band	12q13.13	End	52,385,652 bp

Gene location (Mouse)
Chr.	Chromosome 15 (mouse)
Band	15 F2|15 56.9 cM	Start	101,433,461 bp
Band	15 F2|15 56.9 cM	End	101,441,255 bp
RNA expression pattern
Bgee	Human / Mouse (ortholog); Top expressed in: placenta; skin of abdomen; prefrontal cortex; tonsil; skin of leg; vagina; dorsolateral prefrontal cortex; anterior cingulate cortex; right frontal lobe; pituitary gland / Top expressed in: lip; zygote; secondary oocyte; primary oocyte; morula; morula; cervix; filiform papilla; skin of back; skin of abdomen; More reference expression data
BioGPS	n/a
Gene ontology
Molecular function	structural constituent of cytoskeleton; structural molecule activity; structural constituent of skin epidermis
Cellular component	intermediate filament cytoskeleton; keratin filament; extracellular exosome; intermediate filament; cytosol
Biological process	hair follicle development; regulation of keratinocyte differentiation; nail development; cytoskeleton organization; keratinization; cornification
Sources:Amigo / QuickGO
Orthologs
Databases	NCBI: entry; OMA: entry
Species	Human	Mouse
Entrez	3890	16680
Ensembl	ENSG00000161849	ENSMUSG00000044294
UniProt	Q9NSB2	Q99M73
RefSeq (mRNA)	NM_033045	NM_008474
RefSeq (protein)	NP_149034	NP_032500
Location (UCSC)	Chr 12: 52.38 – 52.39 Mb	Chr 15: 101.43 – 101.44 Mb
PubMed search
- Wikidata
View/Edit Human	View/Edit Mouse

Keratin, type II cuticular Hb4 is a protein that in humans is encoded by the gene KRT84. It is a type II hair keratin contained primarily in the filiform tongue papilla.
