= Keratin 9 =

Protein found in humans

KRT9

Identifiers
- Aliases: KRT9, CK-9, EPPK, K9, keratin 9
- External IDs: OMIM: 607606; MGI: 96696; GeneCards: KRT9

Gene location (Human)
| Chr. | Chromosome 17 (human) |
| Band | 17q21.2 | Start | 41,565,836 bp |
| Band | 17q21.2 | End | 41,572,059 bp |

Gene location (Mouse)
| Chr. | Chromosome 11 (mouse) |
| Band | 11|11 D | Start | 100,077,607 bp |
| Band | 11|11 D | End | 100,084,072 bp |
RNA expression pattern
| Bgee | Human / Mouse (ortholog); Top expressed in: testicle; gonad; human penis; amniotic fluid; gingival epithelium; vulva; skin of thigh; skin of hip; skin of abdomen; muscle tissue / Top expressed in: genital tubercle; dentate gyrus of hippocampal formation granule cell; striatum of neuraxis; superior frontal gyrus; hippocampus proper; primary visual cortex; olfactory bulb; cerebellar cortex; thymus; More reference expression data |
| BioGPS | n/a |
Gene ontology
| Molecular function | structural constituent of cytoskeleton; structural molecule activity |
| Cellular component | extracellular exosome; intermediate filament; membrane; nucleus; extracellular space; cytosol |
| Biological process | intermediate filament organization; spermatogenesis; skin development; epidermis development; keratinization; cornification |
Sources:Amigo / QuickGO
Orthologs
| Databases | NCBI: entry; OMA: entry |
| Species | Human | Mouse |
| Entrez | 3857 | 107656 |
| Ensembl | ENSG00000171403 | ENSMUSG00000051617 |
| UniProt | P35527 | Q6RHW0 |
| RefSeq (mRNA) | NM_000226 | NM_201255 |
| RefSeq (protein) | NP_000217 | NP_957707 |
| Location (UCSC) | Chr 17: 41.57 – 41.57 Mb | Chr 11: 100.08 – 100.08 Mb |
| PubMed search |
- Wikidata
| View/Edit Human | View/Edit Mouse |

Keratin 9 is a protein that in humans is encoded by the KRT9 gene.

Keratin 9 is a type I cytokeratin. It is found only in the terminally differentiated epidermis of palms and soles. Mutations in the gene encoding this protein cause KRT9-palmoplantar epidermal differentiation disorder (KRT9-pEDD), formerly known as epidermolytic palmoplantar keratoderma or Vorner disease.
