= Keratin 8 =

Keratin protein in humans

KRT8

Identifiers
- Aliases: KRT8, CARD2, CK-8, CK8, CYK8, K2C8, K8, KO, keratin 8
- External IDs: OMIM: 148060; MGI: 96705; GeneCards: KRT8

Gene location (Human)
Chr.	Chromosome 12 (human)
Band	12q13.13	Start	52,897,187 bp
Band	12q13.13	End	52,949,954 bp

Gene location (Mouse)
Chr.	Chromosome 15 (mouse)
Band	15 F2|15 57.2 cM	Start	101,905,133 bp
Band	15 F2|15 57.2 cM	End	101,912,917 bp
RNA expression pattern
Bgee	Human / Mouse (ortholog); Top expressed in: mucosa of transverse colon; duodenum; rectum; placenta; islet of Langerhans; olfactory zone of nasal mucosa; body of pancreas; gallbladder; epithelium of bronchus; left lobe of thyroid gland / Top expressed in: ileum; jejunum; colon; duodenum; placenta; stomach; urinary bladder; middle ear; islet of Langerhans; yolk sac; More reference expression data
BioGPS	n/a
Gene ontology
Molecular function	protein-containing complex binding; scaffold protein binding; structural molecule activity; protein binding
Cellular component	cytoplasm; cell-cell junction; nuclear matrix; dystrophin-associated glycoprotein complex; keratin filament; nucleoplasm; Z discdkac; sarcolemma; costamere; extracellular exosome; intermediate filament; nucleus; cell periphery; cytosol; apicolateral plasma membrane; intermediate filament cytoskeleton
Biological process	extrinsic apoptotic signaling pathway; response to hydrostatic pressure; tumor necrosis factor-mediated signaling pathway; response to other organism; viral process; cell differentiation involved in embryonic placenta development; sarcomere organization; hepatocyte apoptotic process; keratinization; cornification
Sources:Amigo / QuickGO
Orthologs
Databases	NCBI: entry; OMA: entry
Species	Human	Mouse
Entrez	3856	16691
Ensembl	ENSG00000170421	ENSMUSG00000049382
UniProt	P05787	P11679
RefSeq (mRNA)	NM_001256282; NM_001256293; NM_002273	NM_031170
RefSeq (protein)	NP_001243211; NP_001243222; NP_002264	NP_112447
Location (UCSC)	Chr 12: 52.9 – 52.95 Mb	Chr 15: 101.91 – 101.91 Mb
PubMed search
- Wikidata
View/Edit Human	View/Edit Mouse

Keratin, type II cytoskeletal 8 also known as cytokeratin-8 (CK-8) or keratin-8 (K8) is a keratin protein that is encoded in humans by the KRT8 gene. It is often paired with keratin 18.

== Utility as an immunohistochemical stain ==
Antibodies to CK8 (e.g. CAM 5.2) can be used to differentiate lobular carcinoma of the breast from ductal carcinoma of the breast. CAM 5.2, an antibody that reacts with an epitope found on both CK8 and CK18, is used in immunohistochemistry to demonstrate certain forms of cancer. In normal tissue, it reacts mainly with secretory epithelia, but not with squamous epithelium, such as that found in the skin, cervix, and esophagus. However, it also reacts with a range of malignant cells, including those derived from secretory epithelia, but also some squamous carcinomata, such as spindle cell carcinoma. It is considered useful in identifying microscopic metastases of breast carcinoma in lymph nodes, and in distinguishing Paget's disease from melanoma. It also reacts with neuroendocrine tumors.

Keratin 8 is often used together with keratin 18 and keratin 19 to differentiate cells of epithelial origin from hematopoietic cells in tests that enumerate circulating tumor cells in blood.

== Interactions ==
Keratin 8 has been shown to interact with MAPK14, Pinin and PPL.

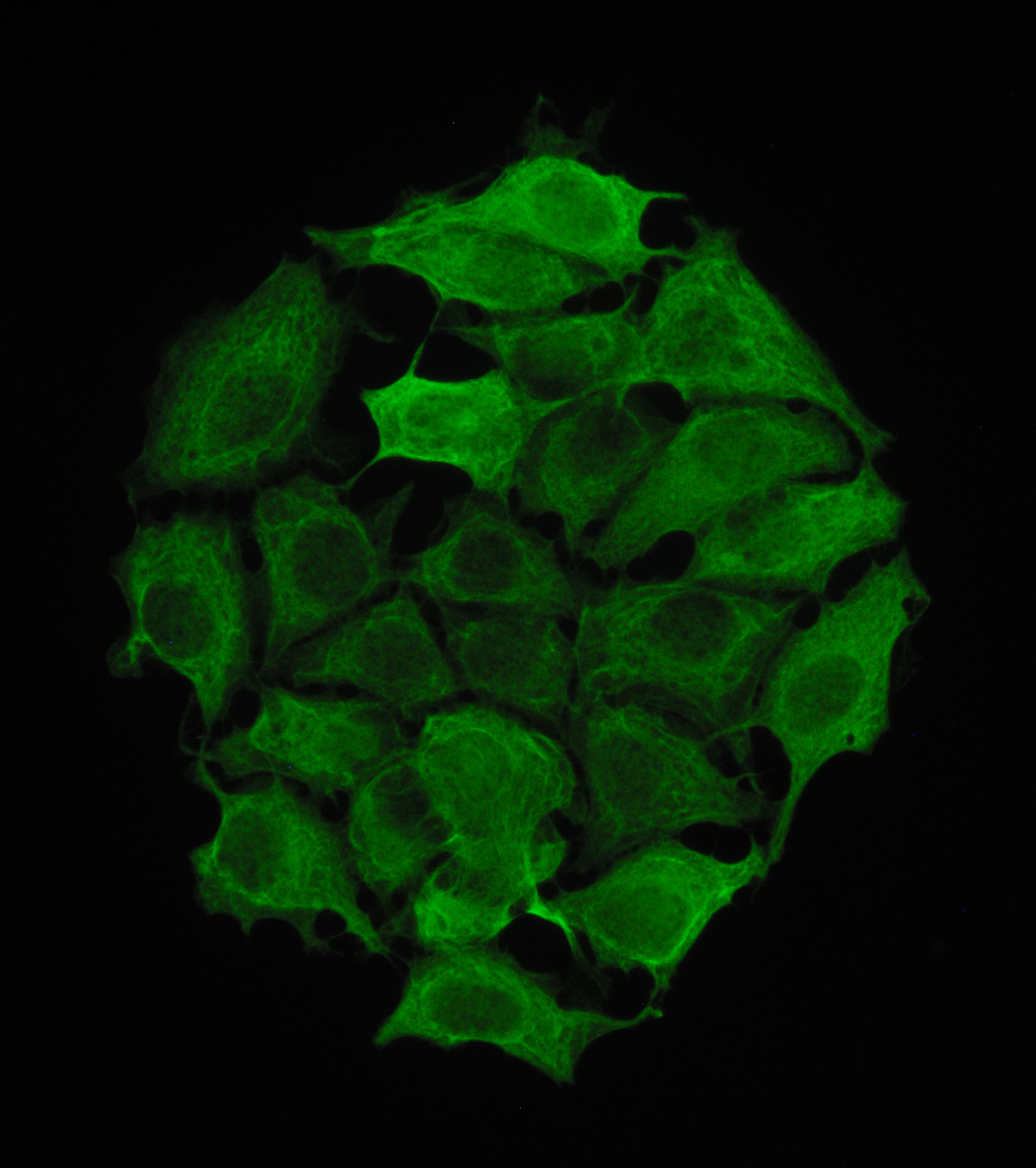
Cytokeratin 8 staining in the human breast cancer cell line MCF-7

== See also ==
- Immunohistochemistry
