= KRT85 =

Protein-coding gene in the species Homo sapiens

Identifiers
- Aliases: KRT85, ECTD4, HB5, Hb-5, K85, KRTHB5, hHb5, keratin 85
- External IDs: OMIM: 602767; MGI: 1859268; GeneCards: KRT85

Gene location (Human)
Chr.	Chromosome 12 (human)
Band	12q13.13	Start	52,360,006 bp
Band	12q13.13	End	52,367,481 bp

Gene location (Mouse)
Chr.	Chromosome 15 (mouse)
Band	15 F2|15	Start	101,413,801 bp
Band	15 F2|15	End	101,422,054 bp
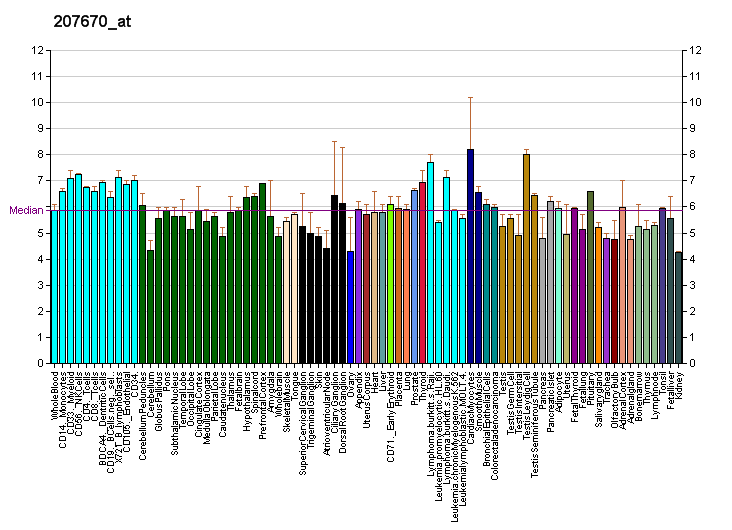
RNA expression pattern
Bgee	Human / Mouse (ortholog); Top expressed in: skin of arm; sperm; testicle; skin of hip; hair follicle; skin of thigh; nipple; gonad; right lung; skin of abdomen / Top expressed in: lip; zone of skin; testicle; spermatid; limb; islet of Langerhans; More reference expression data
BioGPS	More reference expression data
Gene ontology
Molecular function	structural molecule activity
Cellular component	intermediate filament; keratin filament; extracellular space; cytosol
Biological process	epidermis development; keratinization; cornification
Sources:Amigo / QuickGO
Orthologs
Databases	NCBI: entry; OMA: entry
Species	Human	Mouse
Entrez	3891	53622
Ensembl	ENSG00000135443	ENSMUSG00000116336
UniProt	P78386	Q9Z2T6
RefSeq (mRNA)	NM_002283; NM_001300810	NM_016879
RefSeq (protein)	NP_001287739; NP_002274	NP_058575
Location (UCSC)	Chr 12: 52.36 – 52.37 Mb	Chr 15: 101.41 – 101.42 Mb
PubMed search
- Wikidata
View/Edit Human	View/Edit Mouse

Keratin, type II cuticular Hb5 is a protein that in humans is encoded by the KRT85 gene.

The protein encoded by this gene is a member of the keratin gene family. As a type II hair keratin, it is a basic protein which heterodimerizes with type I keratins to form hair and nails. The type II hair keratins are clustered in a region of chromosome 12q13 and are grouped into two distinct subfamilies based on structure similarity. One subfamily, consisting of KRTHB1, KRTHB3, and KRTHB6, is highly related. The other less-related subfamily includes KRTHB2, KRTHB4, and KRTHB5.
