= KRT82 =

Human gene

Identifiers
- Aliases: KRT82, HB2, Hb-2, KRTHB2, keratin 82
- External IDs: OMIM: 601078; MGI: 2149248; GeneCards: KRT82

Gene location (Human)
Chr.	Chromosome 12 (human)
Band	12q13.13	Start	52,393,931 bp
Band	12q13.13	End	52,406,335 bp

Gene location (Mouse)
Chr.	Chromosome 15 (mouse)
Band	15 F2|15 56.9 cM	Start	101,449,649 bp
Band	15 F2|15 56.9 cM	End	101,459,102 bp
RNA expression pattern
Bgee	Human / Mouse (ortholog); Top expressed in: testicle; zone of skin; skin of abdomen; skin of leg; prefrontal cortex; human musculoskeletal system; muscular system; skeletal muscle; right lung; connective tissue / Top expressed in: lip; hair follicle; embryo; tail of embryo; skin of abdomen; skin of back; skin of external ear; More reference expression data
BioGPS	n/a
Gene ontology
Molecular function	structural molecule activity; structural constituent of skin epidermis
Cellular component	intermediate filament; keratin filament; cytosol
Biological process	keratinization; cornification; biological process
Sources:Amigo / QuickGO
Orthologs
Databases	NCBI: entry; OMA: entry
Species	Human	Mouse
Entrez	3888	114566
Ensembl	ENSG00000161850	ENSMUSG00000049548
UniProt	Q9NSB4	Q99M74
RefSeq (mRNA)	NM_033033	NM_053249
RefSeq (protein)	NP_149022	NP_444479
Location (UCSC)	Chr 12: 52.39 – 52.41 Mb	Chr 15: 101.45 – 101.46 Mb
PubMed search
- Wikidata
View/Edit Human	View/Edit Mouse

Keratin, type II cuticular Hb2 is a protein that in humans is encoded by the KRT82 gene. This is a type II keratin and appears to be a hair cuticle-specific.
