= KRT81 =

Protein-coding gene in the species Homo sapiens

Identifiers
- Aliases: KRT81, HB1, Hb-1, KRTHB1, MLN137, ghHkb1, hHAKB2-1, keratin 81, K81
- External IDs: OMIM: 602153; MGI: 1928858; GeneCards: KRT81

Gene location (Human)
Chr.	Chromosome 12 (human)
Band	12q13.13	Start	52,285,913 bp
Band	12q13.13	End	52,291,534 bp

Gene location (Mouse)
Chr.	Chromosome 15 (mouse)
Band	15 F2|15 56.9 cM	Start	101,356,942 bp
Band	15 F2|15 56.9 cM	End	101,361,632 bp
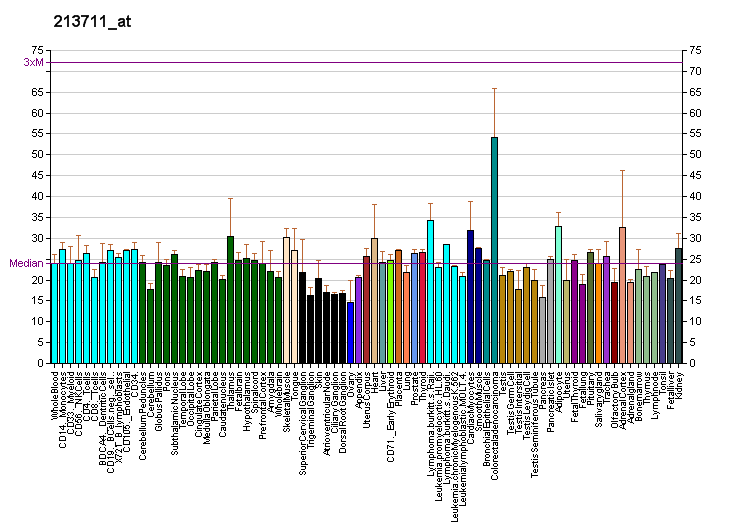
RNA expression pattern
Bgee	Human / Mouse (ortholog); Top expressed in: testicle; hair follicle; placenta; mammary gland; olfactory zone of nasal mucosa; female breast; lactiferous gland; amniotic fluid; right coronary artery; bone / Top expressed in: lip; right ventricle; tibiofemoral joint; hair follicle; granulocyte; skin of back; skin of abdomen; gastrula; motor neuron; sternocleidomastoid muscle; More reference expression data
BioGPS	More reference expression data
Gene ontology
Molecular function	protein binding; structural molecule activity
Cellular component	intermediate filament; keratin filament; extracellular space; cytosol
Biological process	keratinization; cornification
Sources:Amigo / QuickGO
Orthologs
Databases	NCBI: entry; OMA: entry
Species	Human	Mouse
Entrez	3887	64818
Ensembl	ENSG00000205426	ENSMUSG00000067615
UniProt	Q14533	Q9ERE2
RefSeq (mRNA)	NM_002281	NM_001166157
RefSeq (protein)	NP_002272	NP_001159629
Location (UCSC)	Chr 12: 52.29 – 52.29 Mb	Chr 15: 101.36 – 101.36 Mb
PubMed search
- Wikidata
View/Edit Human	View/Edit Mouse

Keratin, type II cuticular Hb1 is a protein that in humans is encoded by the KRT81 gene.

The protein encoded by this gene is a member of the keratin gene family. As a type II hair keratin, it is a basic protein which heterodimerizes with type I keratins to form hair and nails. The type II hair keratins are clustered in a region of chromosome 12q13 and are grouped into two distinct subfamilies based on structure similarity. One subfamily, consisting of KRTHB1, KRTHB3, and KRTHB6, is highly related. The other less-related subfamily includes KRTHB2, KRTHB4, and KRTHB5. All hair keratins are expressed in the hair follicle; this hair keratin, as well as KRTHB3 and KRTHB6, is found primarily in the hair cortex. Mutations in this gene and KRTHB6 have been observed in patients with a rare dominant hair disease, monilethrix.
