= Type I keratin =

Family of cytokeratins

Type I keratins (or Type I cytokeratins) are cytokeratins that constitute the Type I intermediate filaments (IFs) of the intracytoplasmatic cytoskeleton, which is present in all mammalian epithelial cells. Most of the type I keratins consist of acidic, low molecular weight proteins which in vivo are arranged in pairs of heterotypic Type I and Type II keratin chains, coexpressed during differentiation of simple and stratified epithelial tissues.

Type I keratins are encoded on chromosome 17q and encompasses: K9, K10, K11, K12, K13, K14, K15, K16, K17, K18, K19, K20, K21, K22, K23, K24, K25, K26, K27 and K28. Their molecular weight ranges from 40 kDa (K19) to 64 kDa (K9).

== See also ==
- Type II keratin
