= C21orf58 =

Protein-coding gene in the species Homo sapiens

Identifiers
- Aliases: C21orf58, chromosome 21 open reading frame 58
- External IDs: GeneCards: C21orf58

Gene location (Human)
Chr.	Chromosome 21 (human)
Band	21q22.3	Start	46,300,181 bp
Band	21q22.3	End	46,323,875 bp
RNA expression pattern
Bgee	Human / Mouse (ortholog); Top expressed in: right uterine tube; bronchial epithelial cell; ventricular zone; pituitary gland; anterior pituitary; olfactory zone of nasal mucosa; mucosa of paranasal sinus; trabecular bone; ganglionic eminence; mucosa of transverse colon / n/a; More reference expression data
BioGPS	n/a
Orthologs
Databases	NCBI: entry; OMA: entry
Species	Human	Mouse
Entrez	54058	n/a
Ensembl	ENSG00000160298	n/a
UniProt	P58505	n/a
RefSeq (mRNA)	NM_001286462; NM_001286463; NM_001286476; NM_001286477; NM_058180 NM_199071	n/a
RefSeq (protein)	NP_001273391; NP_001273392; NP_001273405; NP_001273406; NP_478060	n/a
Location (UCSC)	Chr 21: 46.3 – 46.32 Mb	n/a
PubMed search		n/a
- Wikidata
View/Edit Human

Chromosome 21 Open Reading Frame 58 (C21orf58) is a protein that in humans is encoded by the C21orf58 gene.

== Gene ==
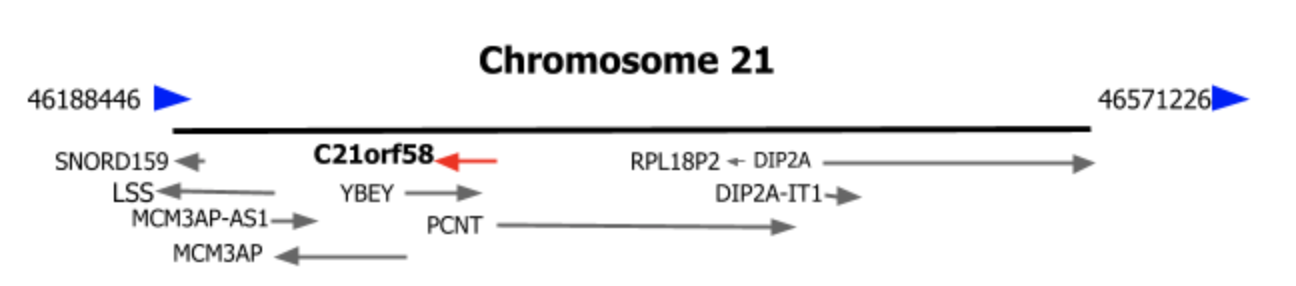
C21orf58 gene neighborhood

=== Locus ===
The gene is located on the minus strand of the distal half of the long arm of Chromosome 21 at 21q22.3. Transcript 1, including UTRs, is 22,740 bp and spans the chromosomal locus 46,301,130-46,323,875.

== mRNA ==
=== Alternative splicing ===
mRNA transcript variants 1-5 encode two validated protein isoforms of C21orf58. Transcript variant 1 encodes the longer, primary isoform (1) (Accession: NP_470860). Transcript variants 2-5 encode the shorter isoform (2). Isoform 2 has a distinct N-terminus in comparison to Isoform 1 resulting from the use of an alternative start codon. A domain of unknown function, DUF4587, is conserved in all variants.

Transcript	Protein	Length (bp)	Length (aa)	Exons	DUF4587 (aa)
1	Isoform 1	2975	322	8	234-291
2	Isoform 2	1674	216	9	128-185
3	Isoform 2	2900	216	7	128-185
4	Isoform 2	2941	216	9	128-185
5	Isoform 2	2624	216	9	128-185

== Protein ==
=== General properties ===
The primary encoded protein consists of 322 amino acids, 8 total exons, and a molecular weight of 39.0 kDa. The predicted isoelectric point is 10.06, supporting predicted nuclear localization.

=== Composition ===
Human protein C21orf58 Isoform 1 is rich in proline and glutamine, and poor in cysteine, phenylalanine, and tyrosine. The protein is particularly tyrosine poor containing zero tyrosine residues. Isoform 1 contains 20 more positive charged residues than negative charged residues providing additional support for the predicted isoelectric point.

=== Domains & motifs ===
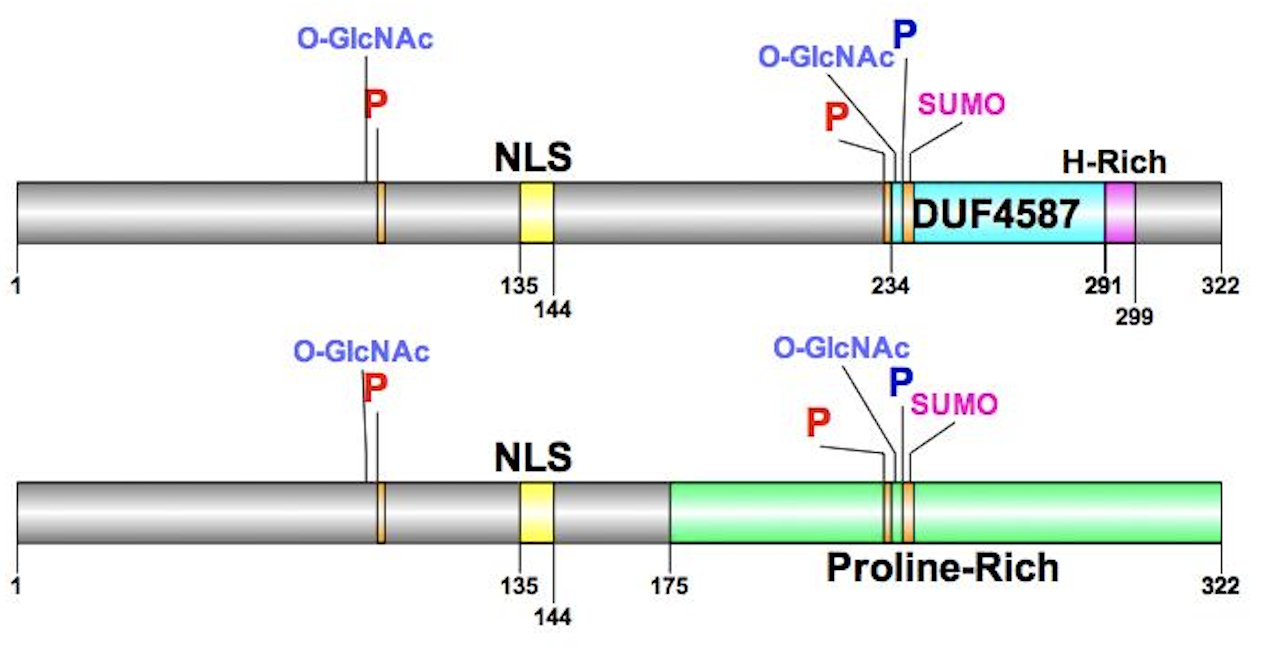
Illustration of C21orf58 annotated with important domains, motifs, and post-translational modifications.

C21orf58 Isoform 1 has three conserved domains: proline-rich domain, histidine rich domain, and DUF4587. Proline-rich domain, Pro^{175}-Pro^{322}, is predicted to mediate protein-protein interactions. Histidine-rich repeat domain, His^{292}-His^{299}, is predicted to facilitate localization. The domain of unknown function, DUF4587 (Arg^{234}- His^{291)}, is a member of pfam15248 exclusively found in eukaryotes.

C21orf58 contains a nuclear localization signal, The^{135}-Leu^{144}.

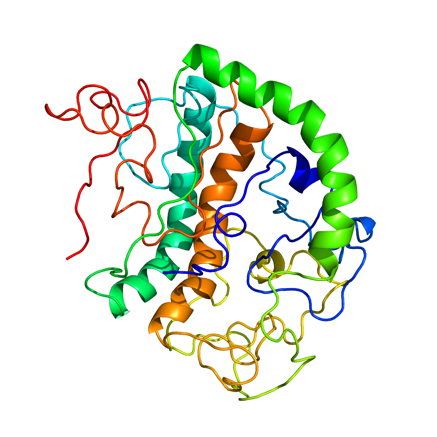
Tertiary structure of C21orf58 predicted by Phyre2

=== Structure ===
Secondary structure of C21orf58 is predicted to consist primarily of random coil domains with four regions of alpha helices throughout the span of the protein. Secondary structure predictions of C21orf58 orthologs revealed similar results; random coil and four regions of alpha helices with the addition of beta-sheets throughout.

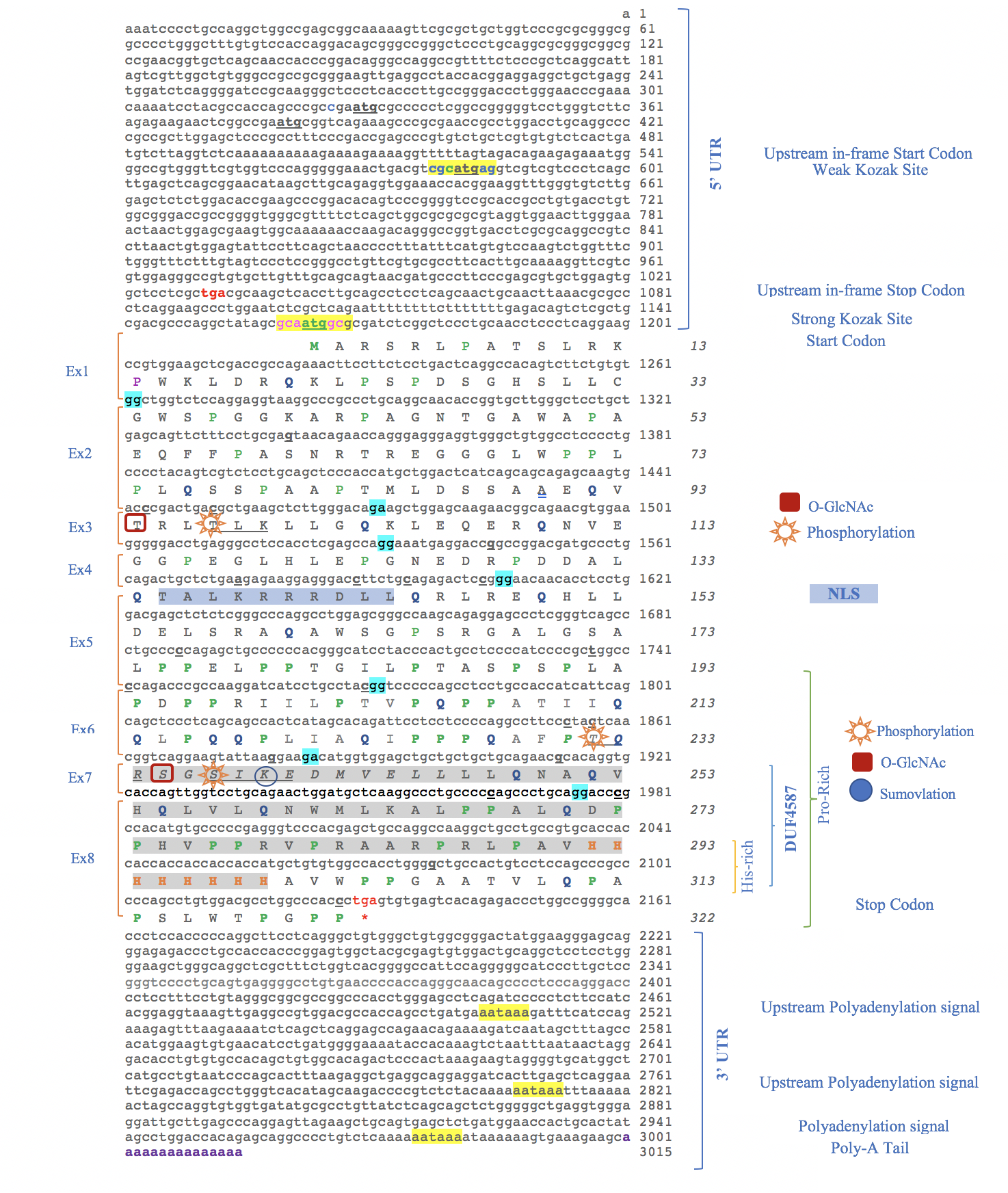
C21orf58 mRNA transcript variant 1 aligned and conceptually translated with important domains, motifs, and post-translational modifications.

=== Post-translational modifications ===
C21orf58 is predicted to undergo multiple post-translational modifications including phosphorylation, O-GlcNAc, and SUMOylation.

=== Subcelluar localization ===
Immunocytochemistry revealed localization of C21orf58 to nucleoplasm and nuclear bodies. Presence of a nuclear localization sequence provides further evidence for protein import into the cell nucleus.

Subcellular localization predictions for C21orf58 based on the amino acid sequence (PSORTII) suggested nuclear localization. Predictions across orthologs agreed with nuclear localization.

== Expression ==
=== Tissue expression pattern ===
C21orf58 is constitutively expressed at low levels across various normal tissues (GDS3113), including but not limited to brain, endocrine, bone marrow, lung, and reproductive tissues.

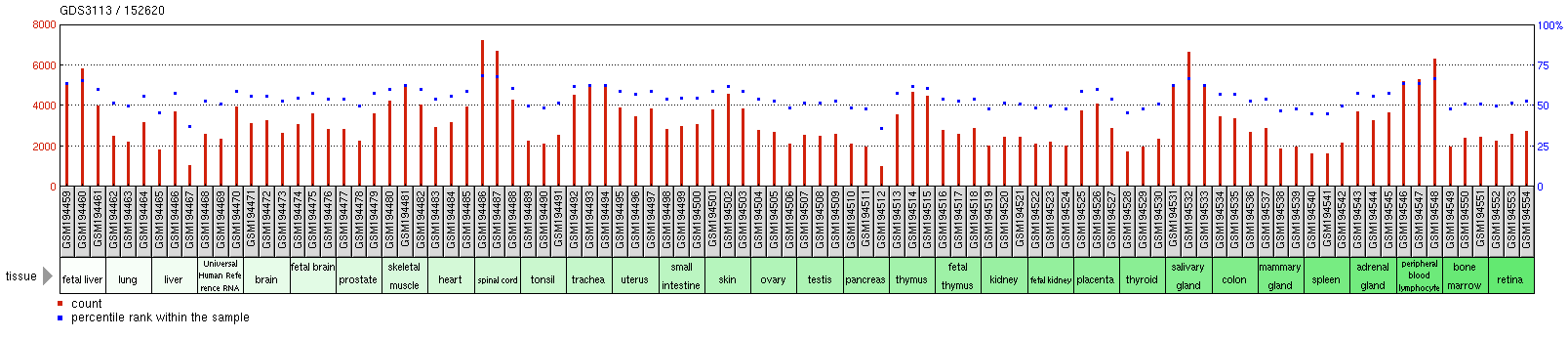
C21orf58 constitutive low level expression across all tissues analyzed (GDS3113)

==== DNA microarray experimental data ====
DNA microarray analysis from various experiments showed variable C21orf58 expression in unique physiological conditions.

- An elevated level of C21orf58 expression was observed in astrocytes treated with harmane, a chemical compound associated with essential tremor (ET), compared to control (GDS2919).
- C21orf58 expression up-regulated and then down-regulated in T lymphocytes over time following exposure to Azaspiracid-1 (AZ-10), a marine phycotoxin (GDS3429).
- C21orf58 expression was found to be up-regulated in teratozoospermic individuals compared to expression in normospermic individuals (GDS2697). Teratozoospermia is a condition where sperm have abnormal morphology affecting male fertility.

C21orf58 was found to be expressed through all stages of development at similar levels throughout.

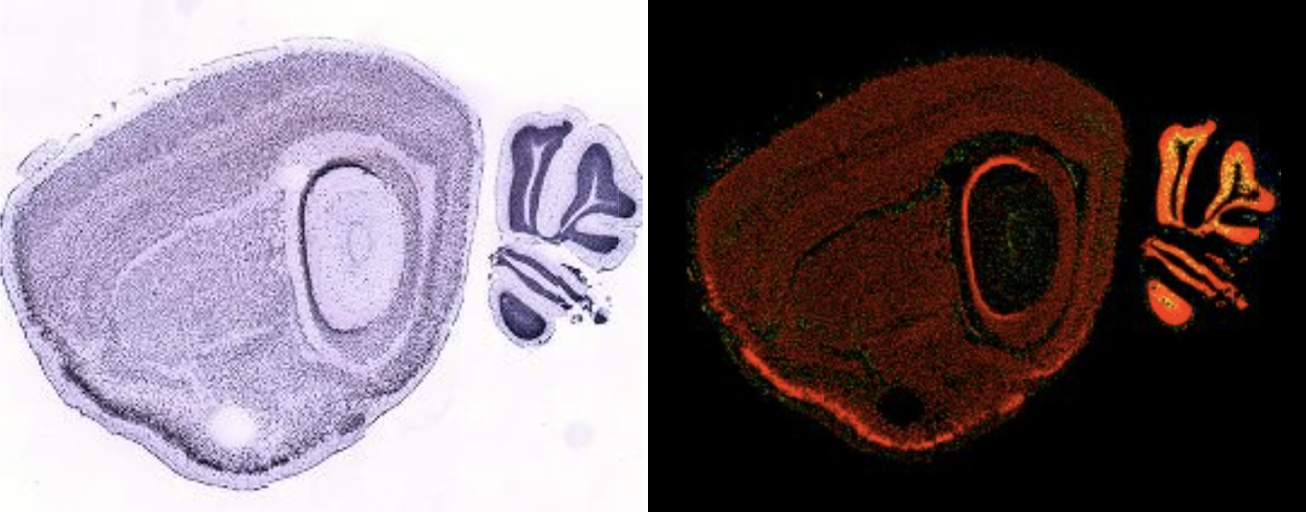
Sagittal plane view of the mouse brain in situ hybridization of C21orf58 otholog in mouse (2610028H24ik). Expression of C21orf58 color-coded by expression intensity ranging from blue (low intensity) through green to red (high intensity). Allen Brain Atlas

==== in situ hybridization ====
C21orf58 ortholog in mouse 2610028H24Rik was found to be ubiquitously expressed at high levels throughout the mouse brain.

== Regulation of expression ==
=== Transcriptional ===
The primary promoter for the longest variant of C21orf58 aligns with the start of the 5'UTR and is 1143bp in length. The predicted promoter sequence overlaps with the 5'UTR and coding sequence of Pericentrin (PCNT) on the plus strand of Chromosome 21. Predicted transcription factors are associated with regulation of the cell cycle, neurogenesis, early development, and sex determination.

Transcription factor	Function
PLAG1	Associated with nuclear import Transcriptional activator
WT1	Role in the development of the urogenital system
ZFX	Implicated in mammalian sex determination
AP-2	Activation of genes in early development Expression in neural crest cell lineages
E2F4	Cell cycle control Tumor suppression
c-Myb	Regulation of hematopoiesis
Elk-1	Transcriptional activator
KLF7	Cell proliferation, differentiation, and survival Regulates neurogenesis
ZBTB33	Promotes histone deacetylation and the formation of repressive chromatic structures
Roaz	Involved in olfactory neuronal differentiation

== Interacting proteins ==
Yeast-two hybrid screening confirmed protein-protein interactions with PNMA1, MTUS2, GRB2. Affinity Capture-MS indicated interactions with MTA2, ASH2L, and FAM199X. Two hybrid prey pooling followed by two hybrid array approach revealed interactions with Ccdc136, Ccdc125, KRT37, KRT27, KRT35, SPTA1, MKRN3, USHBP1, and KLHL20.

Predicted interactions involved proteins associated with the cytoskeleton, cell migration, histone modification, and signal transduction.

Interactor	Function
PNMA1	Neuron- and testis- specific protein Associated with paraneoplastic neurological disorders
MTUS2	Microtubule associated scaffold protein Role in cell migration and linking of microtubules to plasma membrane
GRB2	Signal Transduction
MTA2	Component of NuRD, a nucleosome remodeling deacetylase complex
ASH2L	Component of HMT Set1/Ash2 histone methyltransferase (HTM) complex
Ccdc136	Acrosome formation in spermatogenesis
Ccdc125	Regulation of Cell Migration
KRT37	Type I keratin that heterodimerizes with type II keratin to form hair and nails
KRT27	Member of Type I keratin family Involved in intermediate filament formation
KRT35	Type I keratin that heterodimerizes with type II keratin to form hair and nails
SPTA1	Molecular scaffold protein that links the plasma membrane to actin cytoskeleton
MKRN3	Plays a role in the onset of puberty Part of ubiquitin-proteasome system
USHBP1	Harmonin binding protein Actin filament binding
KLHL20	Actin filament binding Adapter of BCR, a negative regulator of apoptosis

== Homology ==
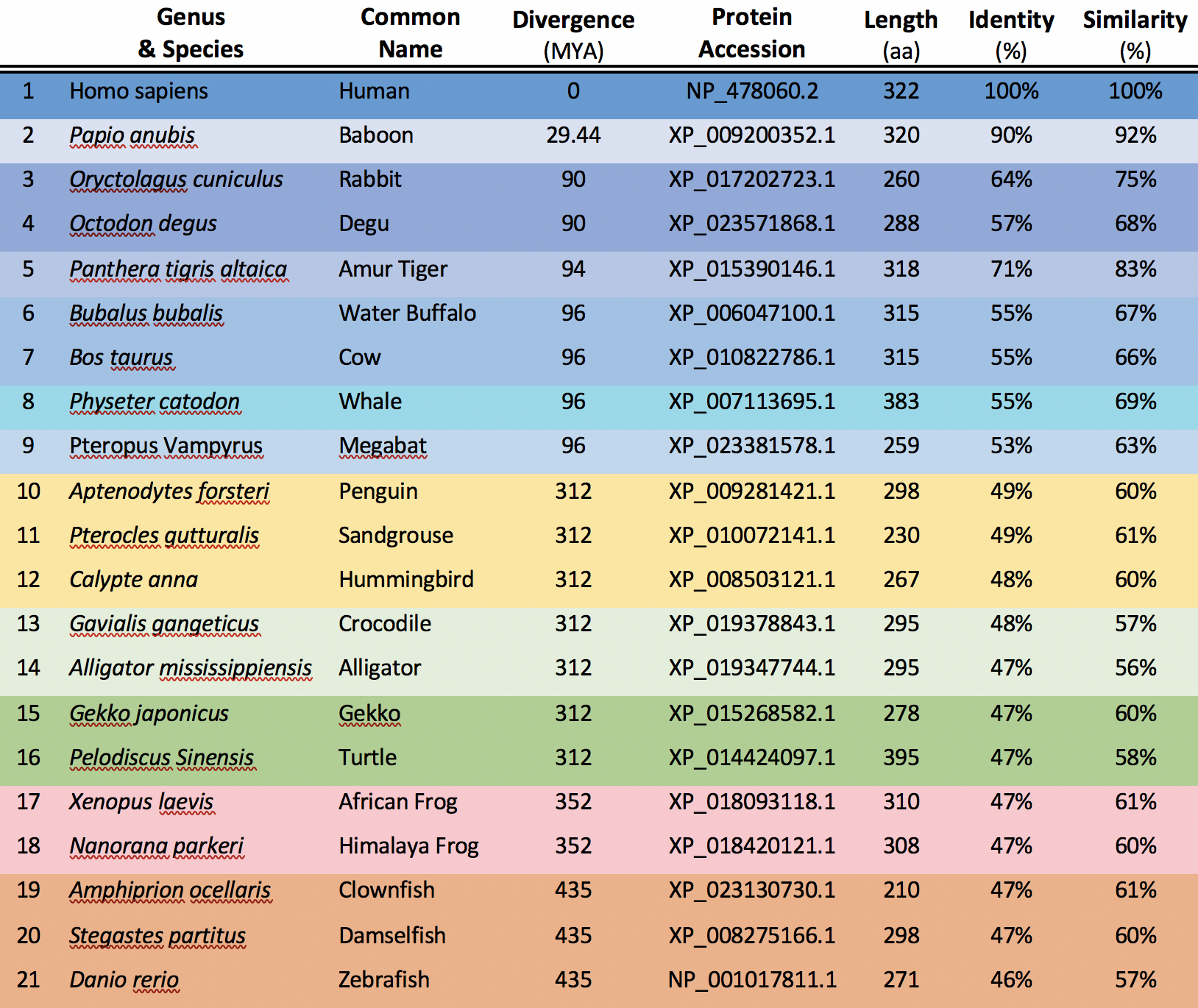
Strict orthologs of C21orf58 by divergence (MYA) and % similarity to human protein C21orf58

=== Paralogs ===
No human paralogs for C21orf58 were identified.

=== Orthologs ===
C21orf58 orthologs were identified in bony fish but not in cartilaginous fish. The first 35 bases of DUF4587, Arg^{234}- Pro^{265}, were conserved across ortholog sequences. The most distantly related ortholog identified was the zebrafish.

=== Molecular evolution ===
The rate of C21orf58 evolution was determined through an application of the Molecular Clock Hypothesis. Through comparison with alpha fibrinogen and cytochrome C, it was determined that C21orf58 has evolved at an intermediate rate.

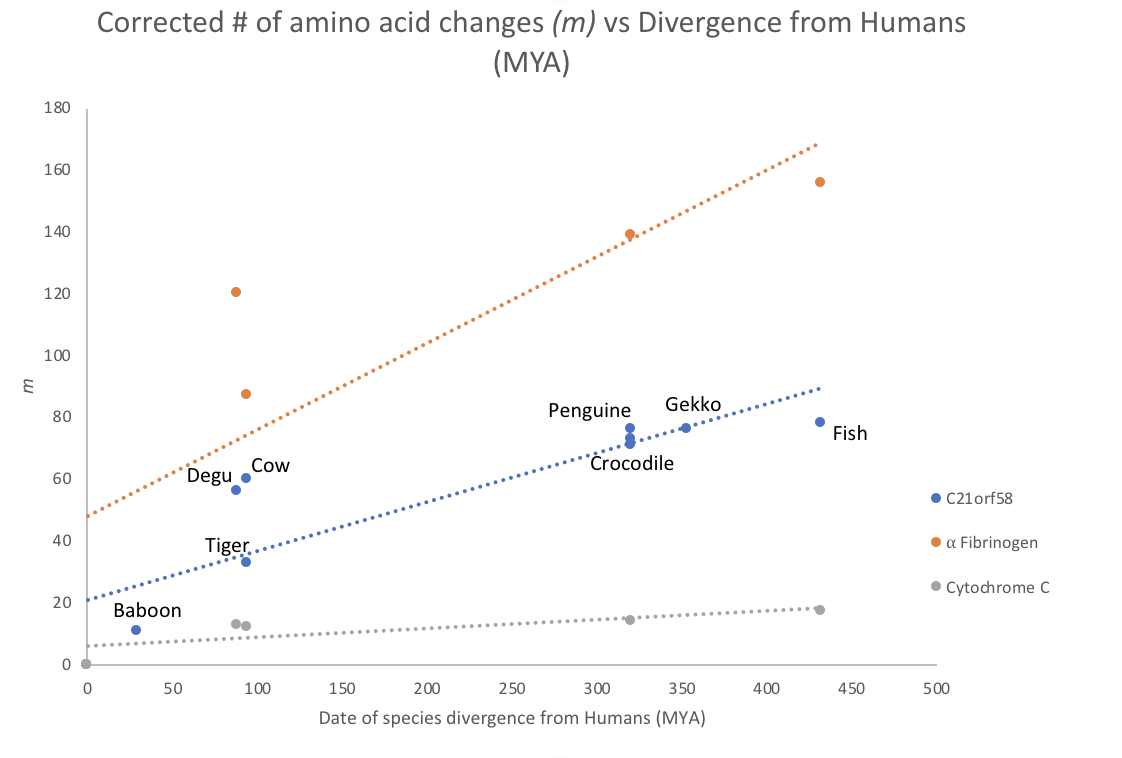
m vs Divergence from Humans (MYA). C21orf58 compared to a quickly evolving gene (α fibrinogen) and a slowly evolving gene (Cytochrome C) across orthologs.
