= PRR29 =

Protein-coding gene in the species Homo sapiens

Identifiers
- Aliases: PRR29, C17orf72, proline rich 29
- External IDs: MGI: 1922823; HomoloGene: 130357; GeneCards: PRR29; OMA:PRR29 - orthologs

Gene location (Human)
Chr.	Chromosome 17 (human)
Band	17q23.3	Start	63,998,351 bp
Band	17q23.3	End	64,004,305 bp

Gene location (Mouse)
Chr.	Chromosome 11 (mouse)
Band	11|11 E1	Start	106,256,298 bp
Band	11|11 E1	End	106,268,384 bp
RNA expression pattern
Bgee	Human / Mouse (ortholog); Top expressed in: right uterine tube; bronchial epithelial cell; olfactory zone of nasal mucosa; tendon of biceps brachii; epithelium of nasopharynx; sperm; nasal epithelium; mucosa of paranasal sinus; right lung; vena cava / Top expressed in: muscle of thigh; skeletal muscle tissue; embryo; sternocleidomastoid muscle; digastric muscle; thymus; medial head of gastrocnemius muscle; extraocular muscle; vastus lateralis muscle; embryo; More reference expression data
BioGPS	n/a
Orthologs
Species	Human	Mouse
Entrez	92340	75573
Ensembl	ENSG00000224383	ENSMUSG00000009210
UniProt	P0C7W0	B1ARI9
RefSeq (mRNA)	NM_001164257; NM_001191029; NM_001191030; NM_001191031	NM_029345
RefSeq (protein)	NP_001157729; NP_001177958; NP_001177959; NP_001177960	NP_083621
Location (UCSC)	Chr 17: 64 – 64 Mb	Chr 11: 106.26 – 106.27 Mb
PubMed search
- Wikidata
View/Edit Human	View/Edit Mouse

Proline-Rich Protein 29

Identifiers
- Symbol: PRR29
- Alt. symbols: C17orf72
- Alt. names: Chromosome 17 Open Reading Frame 72
- NCBI gene: 92340
- RefSeq: NM_001164257.2
- UniProt: P0C7W0

Other data
- Locus: Chr. 17 q23
Search for
- Structures: Swiss-model
- Domains: InterPro

PRR29 (proline-rich protein 29) is a protein encoded by the PRR29 gene located in humans on chromosome 17 at 17q23.

Its function is not fully understood. Its name is derived from the chain of 5 proline amino acids located toward the end of the protein. The primary domain within the sequence of this protein is known as DUF4587. It is reported to have high levels of expression in tissues pertaining to the circulatory system and the immune system. It is hypothesized that PRR29 is a nuclear protein that facilitates communication between the nucleus and the mitochondria.

The gene is also commonly known as C17orf72. The gene has a size of 5961 base pairs and contains five exons.

== Gene ==
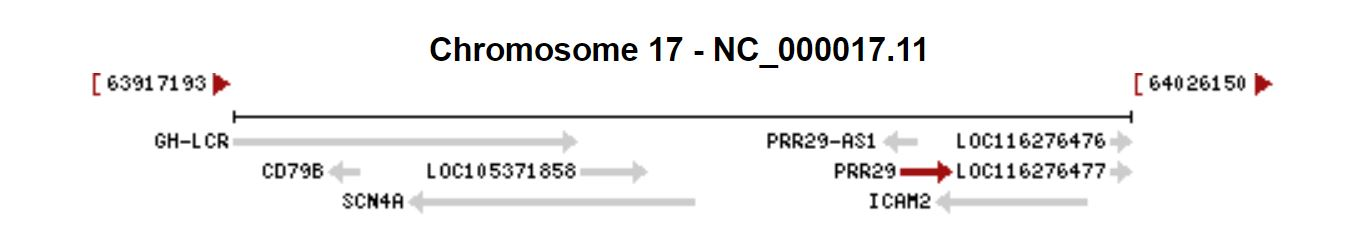
Location of PRR29 gene relative to its neighbors

PRR29 is located on the long arm of chromosome 17 (17q23.3), starting at 63998344 and ending at 64004305. The gene spans 5961 base pairs and is oriented on the plus strand. Genes SNHG25 and LOC105371858 neighbor PRR29 on chromosome 17.The gene ICAM2 is located on the negative strand, directly opposite of PRR29.

The human gene for PRR29, also referred to as C17of72, spans 6 exons and is located at the genomic coordinates chr17:63,998,351-64,002,516 on the positive DNA strand (hg38). It is 4,166 base pairs in length including introns. After they have been removed, the length is shortened to 3,611 base pairs.

== mRNA ==
The gene has 12 common splice variants and one unspliced form. The longest transcribed mRNA is made up of 3048 base pairs and the transcribed protein sequence for this mRNA is 189 amino acids.

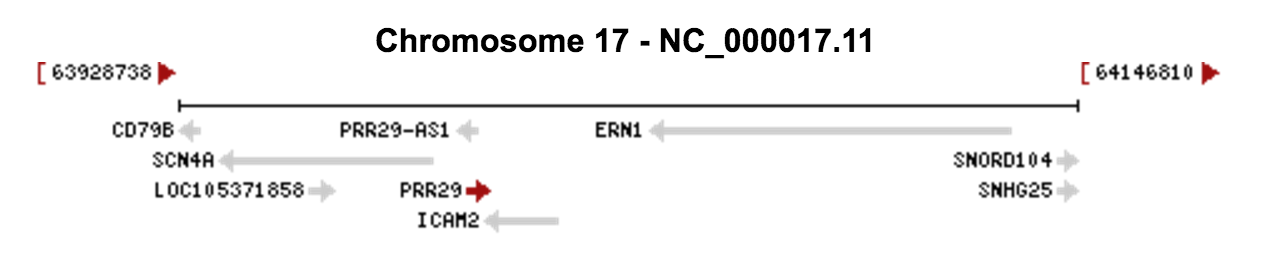
Locus of PRR29

Genomic view of PRR29

== Protein ==
=== General properties ===
Homo sapiens PRR29 has several protein isoforms, with the longest being 236 amino acids. PRR29 has a predicted Isoelectric point of 5.23 and a predicted Molecular weight of 26.1 kilodaltons. PRR29 is characterized by a larger than average proportion of prolines (19.1%) and a smaller than average amount of asparagines (0.4%)

The PRR29 protein is estimated to have a molecular weight of 20.7 kDa. Its isoelectric point is predicted to lie at 4.83.

=== Domains ===
PRR29 contains a proline rich region within its sequence from amino acids 73 to 166. A domain of unknown function, DUF 4587, is also present from amino acids 39 to 112 or 113. DUF 4587 is usually between 64 and 79 amino acids long and contains the two sequence motifs QNAQ and HHH. PRR29 is predicted to contain multiple alpha helix and beta-sheet forming regions. Specifically, the DUF 4587 region is predicted to form an alpha helix.

It contains one proline-rich region motif that extends from amino acid 39 to 107.

=== Secondary and Tertiary Structure ===
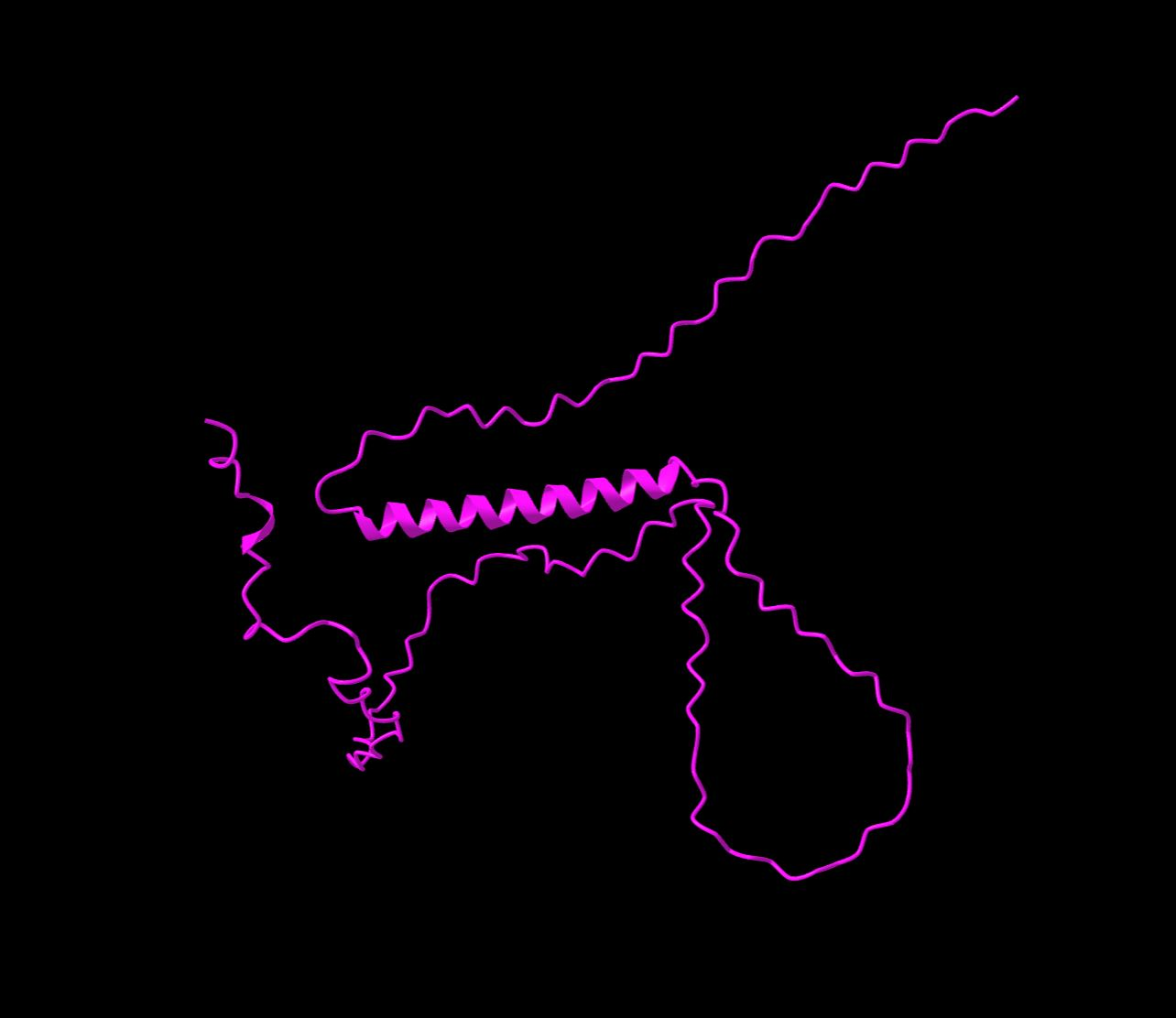
3D structure of PRR29 protein

The secondary structure is characterized by high confidence in the presence of an alpha helix from amino acid 43 to 70 with the rest consisting of coils. In terms of tertiary structure, predictive tools returned low confidence in all sections of the protein besides the core alpha helix.

=== Untranslated Regions ===
The secondary structure of the 5' UTR of PRR29 consists of a singular stem-loop that is almost wholly conserved between orthologs. The 3' UTR is much longer, containing 41 different stem loops in its secondary structure. Any predicted miRNA binding to PRR29 is believed to be nonfunctional.

=== Subcellular localization ===
Using PSORTII, PRR29 is predicted to localize in the nucleus of the cell. PSORTII does not predict any targeting sequences or signal peptides. Data on localization of PRR29 within cells shows that it is primarily found in the nucleus, followed by the mitochondria and cytoplasm.

=== Post-Translational Modification ===
PRR29 is predicted to undergo sumoylation, acetylation, and serine, threonine and tyrosine phosphorylation. The most common types of post-translational modification that occur for this protein are phosphorylation, glycosylation, hydroxylation, and sumoylation. They contribute to the stability, structure, and folding of the protein.

=== Interactions ===
The interactome of PRR29 is not yet well characterized. One experimental study found that a Sus scrofa PRR29-like protein interacts with the N-terminal protease of classical swine fever virus (CSFV).

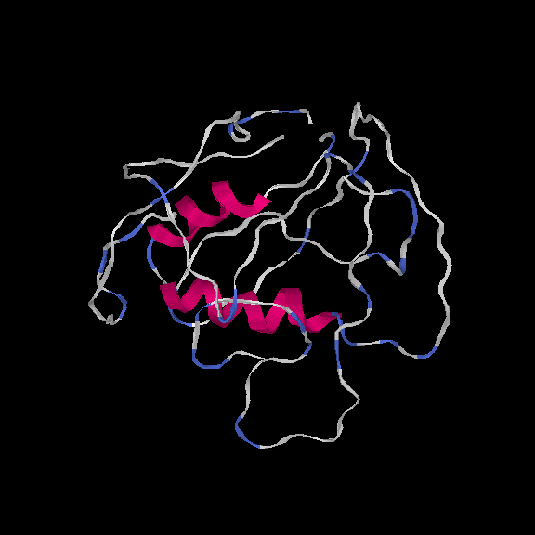
3D structure prediction from I-TASSER

== Expression ==
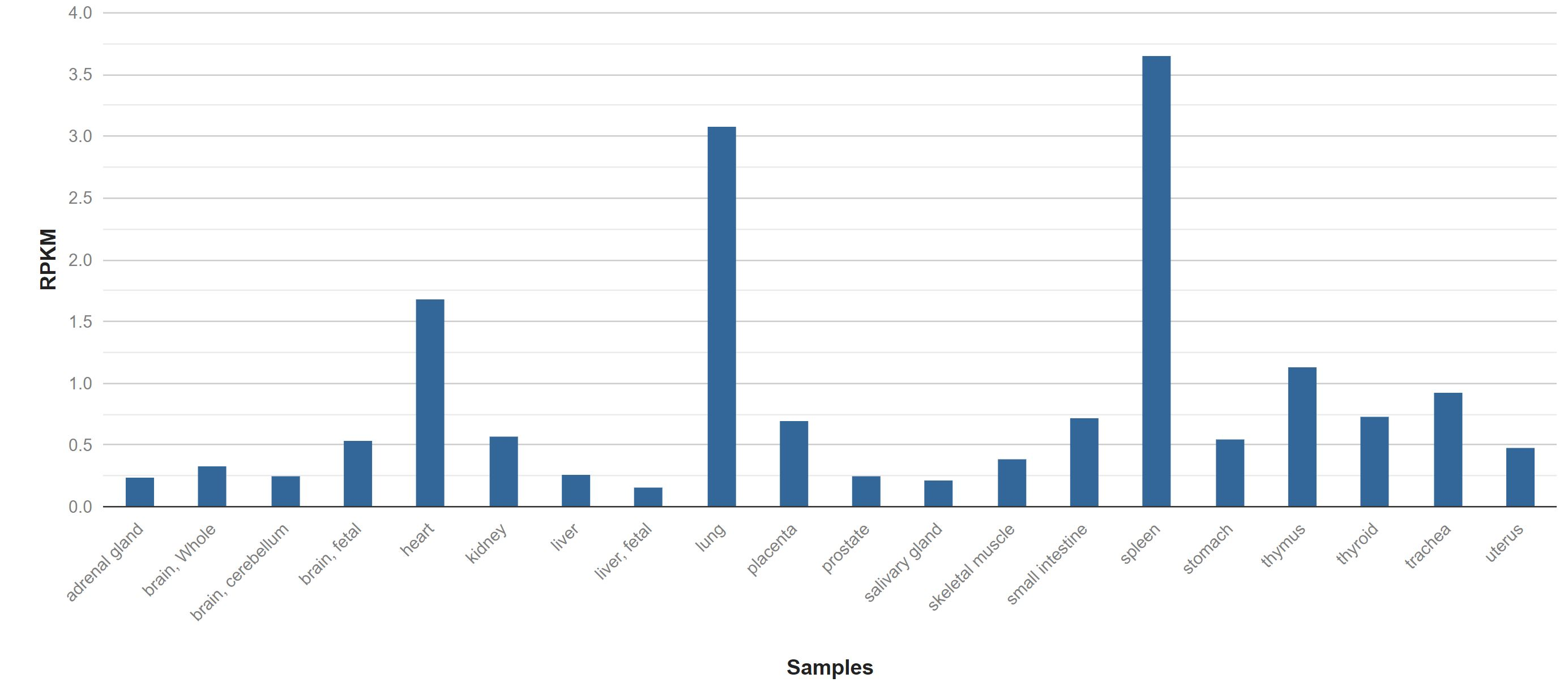
Expression data for PRR29 based on RNA sequencing of human tissue samples

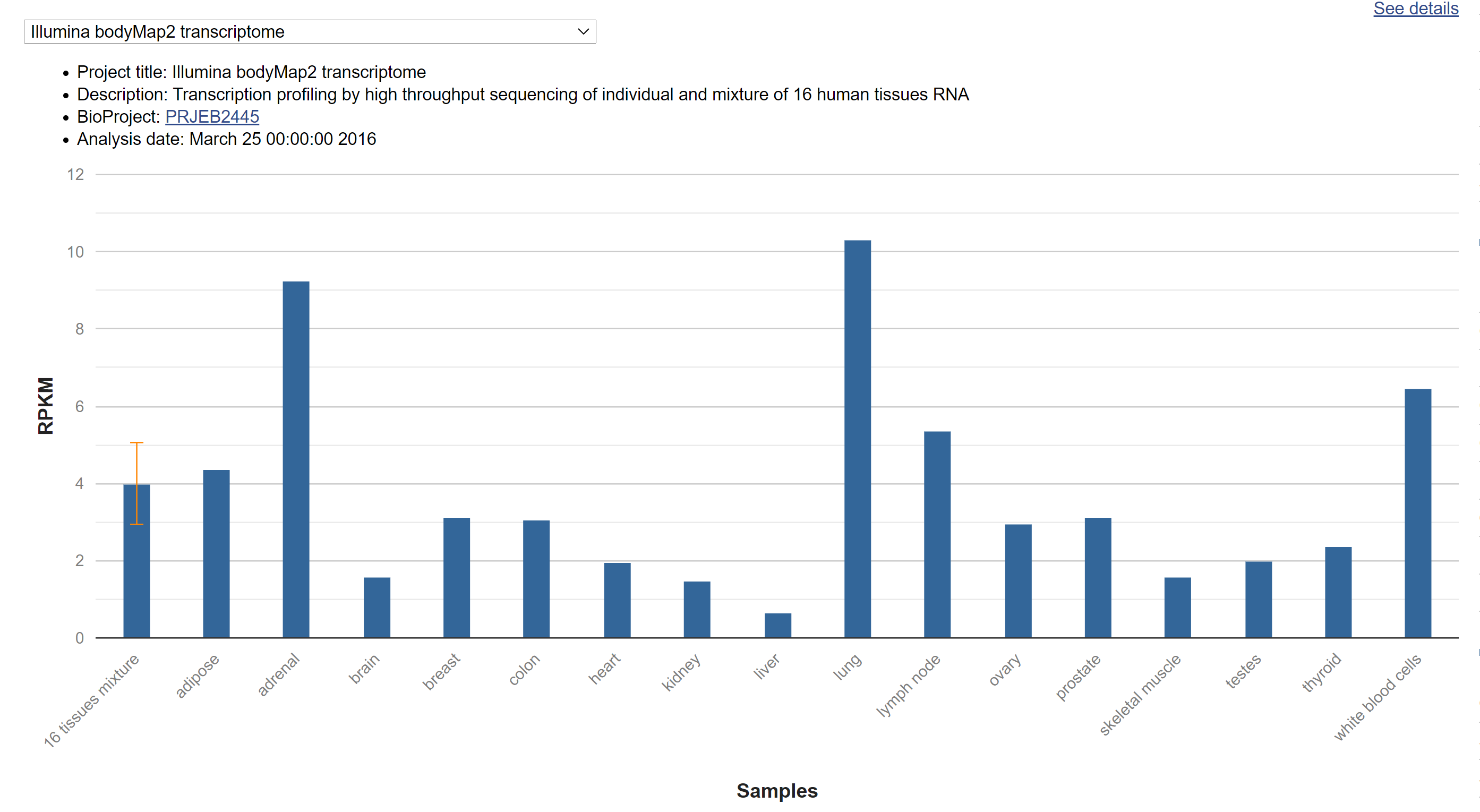
Expression data for PRR29 from Illumina bodyMap 2 transcriptome

PRR29 is ubiquitously expressed throughout the body. However, there is particularly high expression in the ovaries, muscle, heart, testes, and thymus. According to PaxDb, PRR29 abundance falls in the bottom 5% relative to other proteins.

Its expression is concentrated in related tissues including the spleen, lungs, white blood cells, and heart. In situ hybridization data reveals that expression in the human brain is brain is relatively low in the forebrain but higher in the basal ganglia, midbrain, and hindbrain with the exception of the cerebellar cortex. For comparison, expression in the mouse brain is focused in the isocortex, olfactory region, hippocampus, cortical subplate, and cerebellum.

=== Transcript-Level Regulation ===
Prediction of transcription factors that bind to the promoter region for PRR29 include ones involved with the activation of leukocytes and the formation of blood cells. Abundance of the protein relative to others found in the human body is currently unknown.

== Homology ==
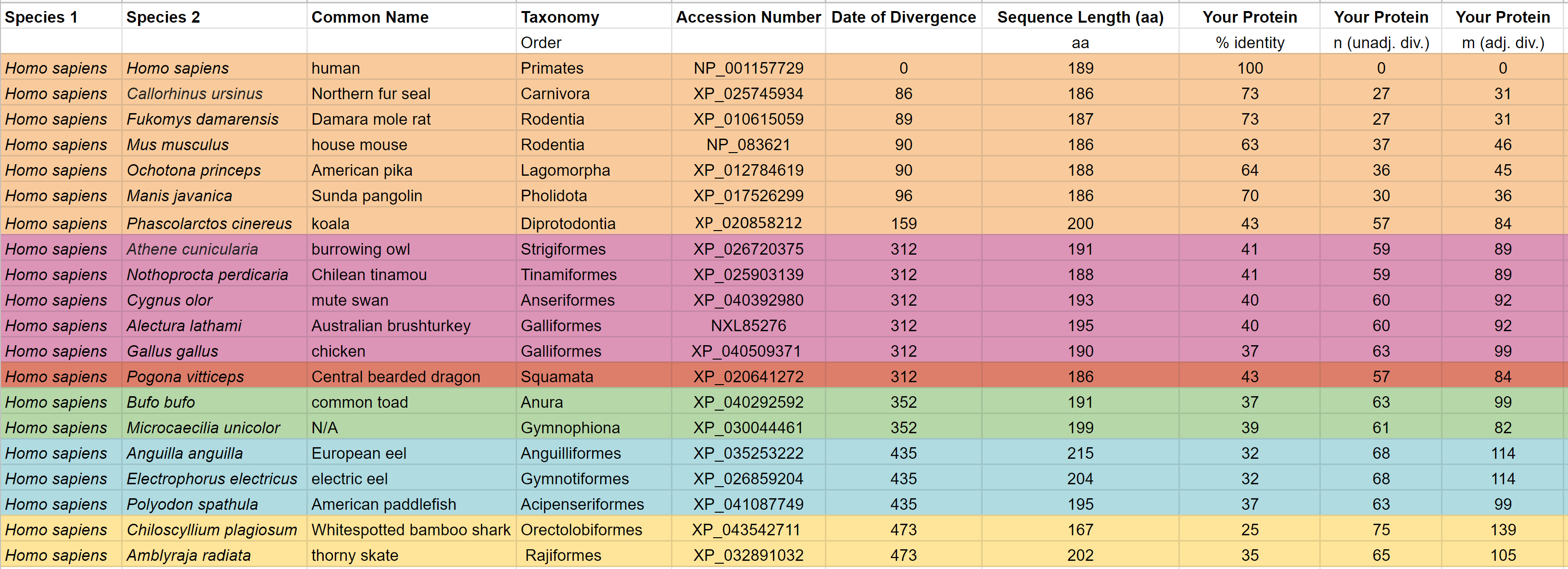
A table comparing the divergence of PRR29 in different species relative to the human gene.

PRR29 has a single known paralog, C21orf58. PRR29 is well conserved among chordates and PRR29-like proteins containing the DUF 4587 have been predicted in protostomes, such as Mollusca and Annelida. DUF 4587 is highly conserved in all PRR29 orthologs and is also present in its paralog, C21orf58. This domain has been found in species as distantly related as Capitella teleta, which diverged from humans 847 million years ago.

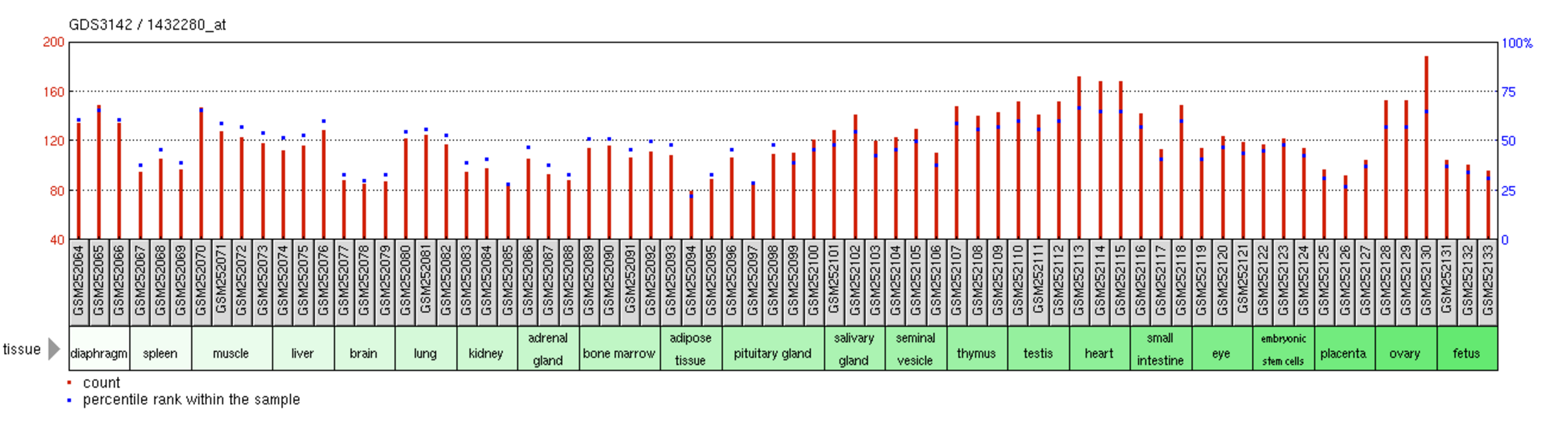
PRR29 Expression

This gene has orthologs in other animal species. It has only been found in vertebrates with the oldest being the whitespotted bamboo shark.

PRR29 does not have any known paralogs.

Genus and Species	Common name	Divergence date from human (MYA)	Protein accession #	Sequence length (aa)	Identity to human sequence	Similarity to human sequence
Homo sapiens	Human	0	NP_001177958.1	236	1	1
Nannospalax galili	Blind mole-rat	90.9	XP_008844796.1	181	0.62	0.68
Bubalus bubalis	Water buffalo	97.5	XP_006041674.1	236	0.56	0.65
Monodelphis domestica	opossum	163.7	XP_007482631.1|	195	0.51	0.62
Aquila chrysaetos canadensis	Golden eagle	320	XP_011593496.1	170	0.36	0.48
Anolis carolinensis	Anole Lizard	320.5	XP_008111611.1	186	0.39	0.52
Xenopus laevis	African clawed frog	355.7	NP_001079741.1	309	0.34	0.49
Esox lucius	Northern Pike	429	XP_010873077.1	197	0.48	0.74
Branchiostoma floridae	lancelet	733	XP_002603029.1	1341	0.37	0.71
Ciona intestinalis	Ciona intestinalis	733	XP_009857401.1	227	0.43	0.67
Capitella teleta	Capitella teleta	847	ELU01749	558	0.37	0.51
Lottia gigantea	Owl limpet	847	XP_009046359.1	299	0.33	0.54

PRR29 Unrooted Phylogenetic Tree

== Evolution ==
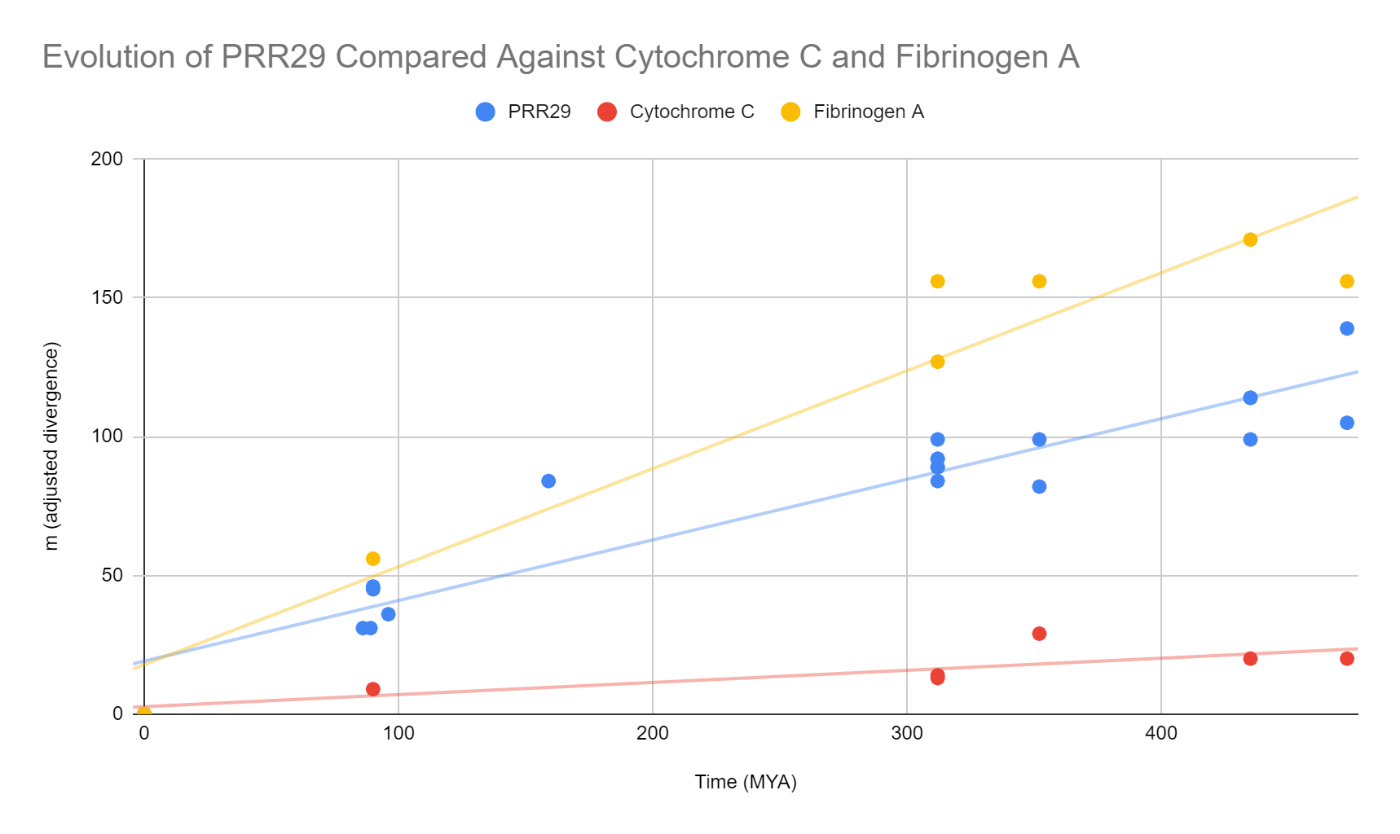
PRR29's rate of mutation compared to that of cytochrome c and fibrinogen alpha

This gene evolves at a rate higher than that of cytochrome c but lower than that of fibrinogen alpha chain.

== Clinical Significance ==
It is unknown if PRR29 is directly linked to any diseases.

Experiments have been performed on tissue and cell samples in order to observe any potential changes in expression of the protein under different conditions. Samples inflicted with pulmonary sarcoidosis and small cell lung cancer did not experience and significant changes in expression compared to normal cells. Intracranial artery aneurysm did induce change, leading to heightened expression
