= ZCCHC18 =

Protein-coding gene in the species Homo sapiens

Identifiers
- Aliases: ZCCHC18, PNMA7B, SIZN2, zinc finger CCHC-type containing 18
- External IDs: MGI: 1914245; GeneCards: ZCCHC18

Gene location (Mouse)
Chr.	X chromosome (mouse)
Band	X|X F1	Start	135,893,904 bp
Band	X|X F1	End	135,899,221 bp
RNA expression pattern
Bgee	Human / Mouse (ortholog); Top expressed in: endothelial cell; middle temporal gyrus; Brodmann area 23; ganglionic eminence; popliteal artery; hypothalamus; cerebellar hemisphere; islet of Langerhans; Brodmann area 9; nucleus accumbens / Top expressed in: ventromedial nucleus; dorsomedial hypothalamic nucleus; nucleus accumbens; paraventricular nucleus of hypothalamus; lateral hypothalamus; central gray substance of midbrain; anterior amygdaloid area; nucleus of stria terminalis; arcuate nucleus; lateral septal nucleus; More reference expression data
BioGPS	n/a
Gene ontology
Molecular function	nuclear receptor coactivator activity; metal ion binding
Cellular component	nuclear speck
Biological process	BMP signaling pathway; positive regulation of nucleic acid-templated transcription
Sources:Amigo / QuickGO
Orthologs
Databases	NCBI: entry
Species	Human	Mouse
Entrez	644353	66995
Ensembl	n/a	ENSMUSG00000031428
UniProt	P0CG32	Q8VD24
RefSeq (mRNA)	NM_001143978	NM_001035509; NM_001035510; NM_025893; NM_001358437; NM_001358439 NM_001358440; NM_001358441
RefSeq (protein)	NP_001137450	NP_001030586; NP_001030587; NP_080169; NP_001345366; NP_001345368 NP_001345369; NP_001345370
Location (UCSC)	n/a	Chr X: 135.89 – 135.9 Mb
PubMed search
- Wikidata
View/Edit Human	View/Edit Mouse

Zinc finger CCHC-type containing 18 (ZCCHC18) is a protein that in humans is encoded by ZCCHC18 gene. It is also known as Smad-interacting zinc finger protein 2 (SIZN2), para-neoplastic Ma antigen family member 7b (PNMA7B), and LOC644353. Other names such as zinc finger, CCHC domain containing 12 pseudogene 1, P0CG32, ZCC18_HUMAN had been used to describe this protein.

ZCCHC18 belongs to the ZCCHC12 family or para-neoplastic Ma (PNMA). It is a ligand-dependent nuclear receptor transcription coactivator. Its zinc finger domain is CCHC which binds to zinc ion (see protein section for detail information on CCHC motif).

It is worthwhile to mention that in mammals, PNMA is derived from Ty3/Gypsy long terminal repeat (LTR) retrotransposons and PNMA family encodes the Gag-like protein. Although the full functions remain unknown, most PNMA genes are expressed in brains of macaques and mice. PNMA2, 1 and 3 were found in the serum of patients with paraneoplastic neurological disorders. The family also includes modulator of apoptosis 1, having a role in death receptor-dependent apoptosis.

== Gene ==
=== Location ===
ZCCHC18 gene locates at the long arm of X chromosome, loci position Xq22.2. This gene contains 3 exons and 2 distinct gt-ag introns, being transcribed into 3 alternatively spliced mRNAs. However, only one spliced mRNA (NM_001143978.2, 2951 bp) putatively encodes a 403 amino acid protein, whereas the others does not encode proteins.

=== Gene neighborhood ===
Nearby genes include SLC25A53 (on the negative strand) (about 8,000 base pairs (bps) upstream) and FAM199X (on the positive strand) (about 50,800 bps downstream).

=== Expression ===
ZCCHC18 ubiquitously expresses in ovary, brain (cerebellum), endometrium, lymph node, spleen and 22 other tissues in human and other species. Based on RNA-Seq expression data from GTEx (53 tissues from 570 donors), highest median expression is in brain—cerebellum (4.74 RPKM) whereas the total median expression of 67.54 RPKM.

=== Promoter ===
Possible transcription binding sites is analyzed by Genomatix, listed in the table below:

Possible transcription factors and binding sites of ZCCHC18 identified by Genomatix
Matrix Family	Detailed Family Information	Anchor position	Strand	Matrix sim.	Sequence
V$AP1R	MAF and AP1 related factors	1225	-	0.996	gcacggcgtcAGCAgctcggacgca
V$MZF1	Myeloid zinc finger 1 factors	1040	-	0.995	agGGGGaagcg
V$ZF02	C2H2 zinc finger transcription factors 2	1916	-	0.993	caccccgCCCCcgacacccaaca
V$CAAT	CCAAT binding factors	1368	-	0.991	gcggCCAAtcagcgg
V$SORY	SOX/SRY-sex/testis determining and related HMG box factors	307	+	0.989	gggtcaCAAAgggctgtcgaaat
V$ZFHX	Two-handed zinc finger homeodomain transcription factors	1029	+	0.988	acgctGTTTcccc
V$ZTRE	Zinc transcriptional regulatory element	503	-	0.984	gagGGAGggggtgagga
V$ZTRE	Zinc transcriptional regulatory element	2165	+	0.984	gcgGGAGggcaggaggc
V$NEUR	NeuroD, Beta2, HLH domain	774	+	0.982	ctccCATCtggcttt
V$MIZ1	Myc-interacting Zn finger protein 1	480	+	0.981	tcagcCCTCtc
V$IKRS	Ikaros zinc finger family	1483	+	0.98	ccttGGGAaccgt
V$CEBP	Ccaat/Enhancer Binding Protein	713	+	0.979	tcatcTGTGaaatgg
V$GATA	GATA binding factors	724	+	0.974	tggaGATAatggt
O$INRE	Core promoter initiator elements	1407	+	0.972	tcTCAGtcgcc
V$AP2F	Activator protein 2	1281	-	0.936	ctgGCCGgcgggccg
V$MAZF	Myc associated zinc fingers	1126	+	0.904	cccgGAGGagagc

=== Homology ===
==== Orthologs ====
Orthologs of ZCCHC18 can be found in most Chordata (Mammalia, Amphibian, Reptilian, Osteichthyes, but not in Arthropod, Aves, Chondrichthyes), Echinoderm, and Cnidarian but not in Fungus, Plant, Ciliates, Archaea, nor Bacteria.

==== Paralogs ====
Eight possible paralogs of ZCCHC18 were identified in Homo sapiens.

Gene Name	Accession	Coverage	E-Value	Sequence identity %
PNMA7A (ZCCHC12)	NP_776159.1	99%	0	84%
PNMA3	NP_001269464.1	91%	4.00E-40	29%
PNMA1	NP_006020.4	45%	3.00E-39	43%
PNMA5	NP_443158.1	47%	4.00E-39	41%
PNMA2	NP_009188.1	48%	5.00E-39	41%
PNMA6A (PNMA6C)	NP_116271.3	52%	6.00E-27	38%
PNMA6E	NP_001338223.1	48%	4.00E-21	36%
PNMA6F (PNMA6BL)	NP_001341909.1	54%	1.00E-18	33%

Note: PNMA4 (aliases: modulator of apoptosis 1, MOAP1) does not appear to be similar to ZCCHC18 (the identity and similarity between ZCCHC18 and MOAP1 are 15% and 32.1%, respectively).

== Transcript ==
=== Splice variants ===
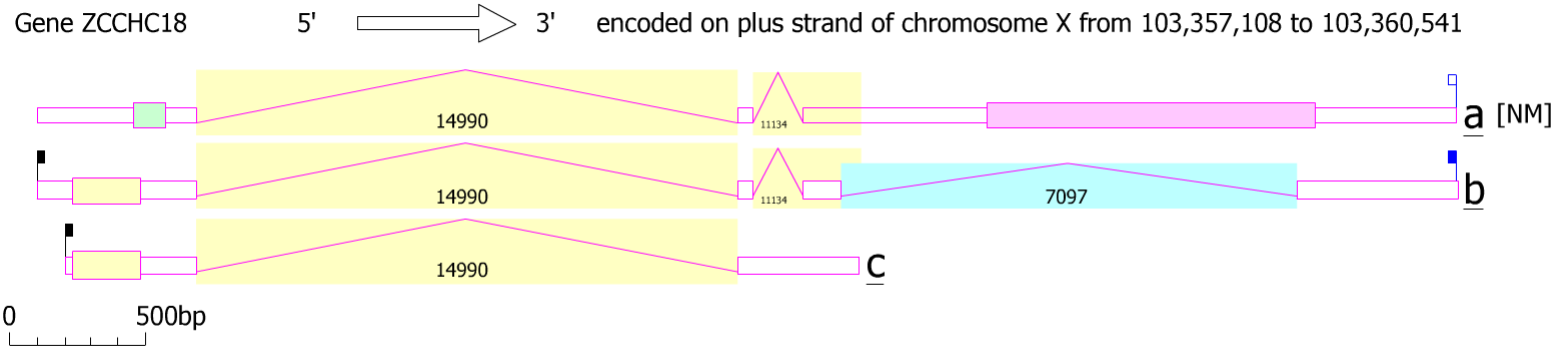
Alternative splicing of ZCCHC18 mRNAs in Homo sapiens

Including 5’-UTR and 3’-UTR, ZCCHC18 spans from chrX:104,112,526-104,115,846 with a total of 3,321 base pairs (bps) (5’-UTR: 1206 bps and 3’-UTR: 523 bps). It contains 3 exons and 2 distinct gt-ag introns, being transcribed into 3 alternatively spliced mRNAs. However, only one spliced mRNA (NM_001143978.2, 2951 bps) putatively encodes a protein with 403 amino acids (coding region: hg38 chrX:104,114,112-104,115,323, total 1,212 bps), whereas others do not encode proteins.

Comparing to human ZCCHC18 mRNA which there are 3 isoforms, there are 7 isoforms of Zcchc18 in mouse (Mus musculus), and no isoform in cat (Felis catus) and leopard (Panthera pardus).

== Protein ==
ZCCHC18 is a human protein with 403 amino acids in length and has a predicted molecular weight of 45,160 daltons. Its basal isoelectric point is 7.02 (unphosphorylated state), and isoelectric point decreased with increased number of residues being phosphorylated. The common sequences of ZCCHC18 include KRED and LVIFM. It is generally electroneutral (there are no positive or negative charge clusters or segments) with no high hydrophobic segments.

=== Secondary structure ===
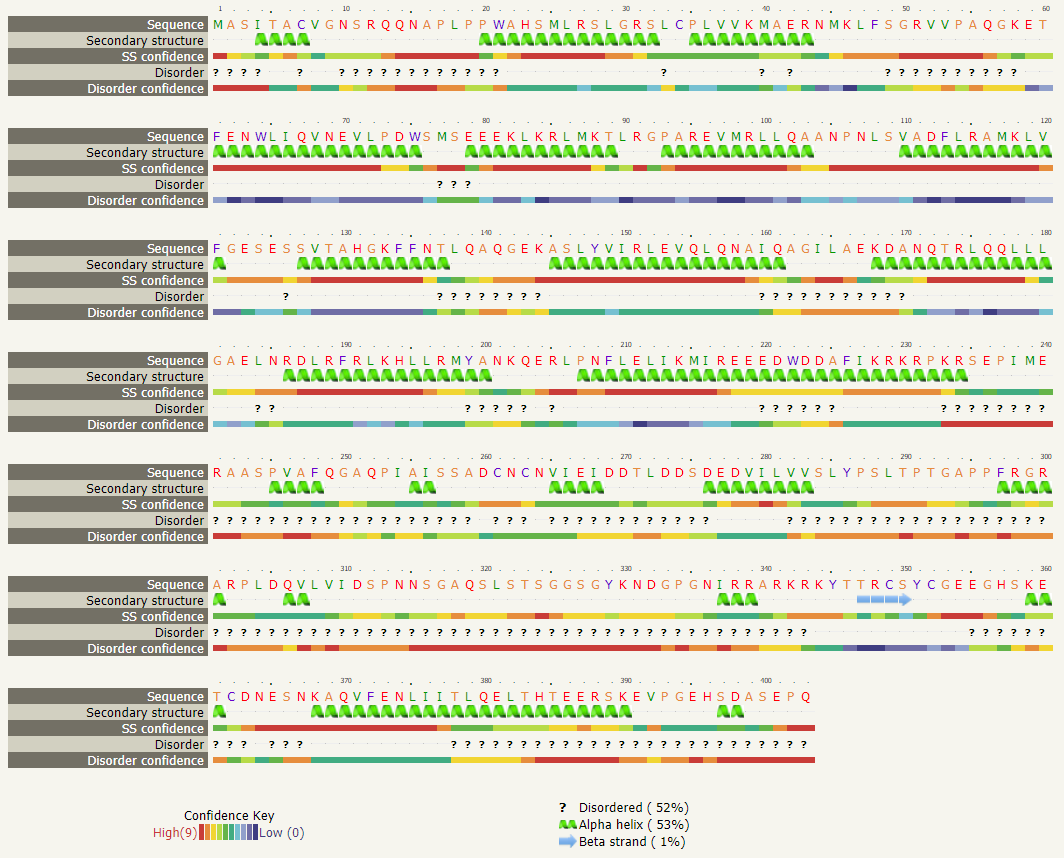
ZCCHC18 secondary structure

Secondary structure prediction of a not well-characterized protein can be performed by using PRBI database, Phyre2, and I-TASSER. The secondary structure prediction of ZCCHC18 was analyzed by Phyre2.

=== Tertiary structure ===
The tertiary structure was predicted by I-TASSER in the attempt to optimize C-score, TM-score, and cluster density. The predicted ZCCHC18 tertiary structure is shown in the figure.

=== Post-translational modifications ===
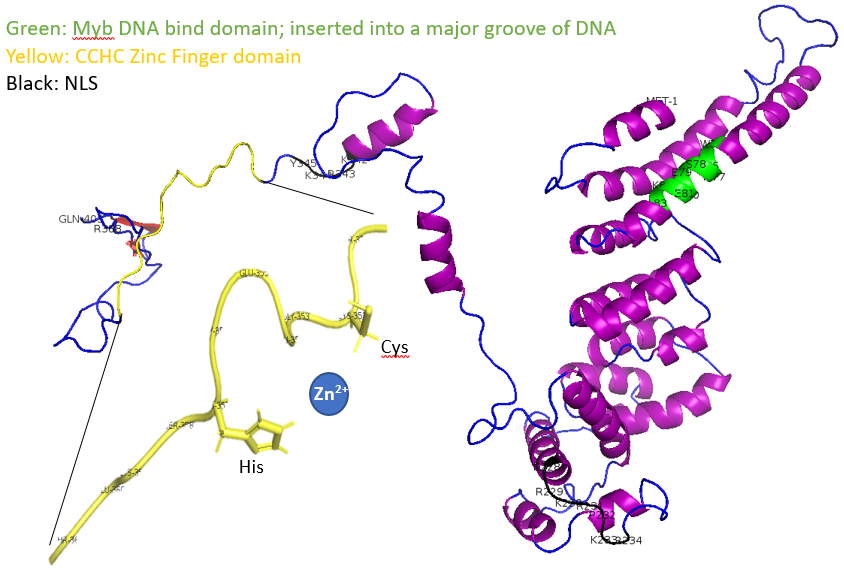
ZCCHC18 tertiary structure

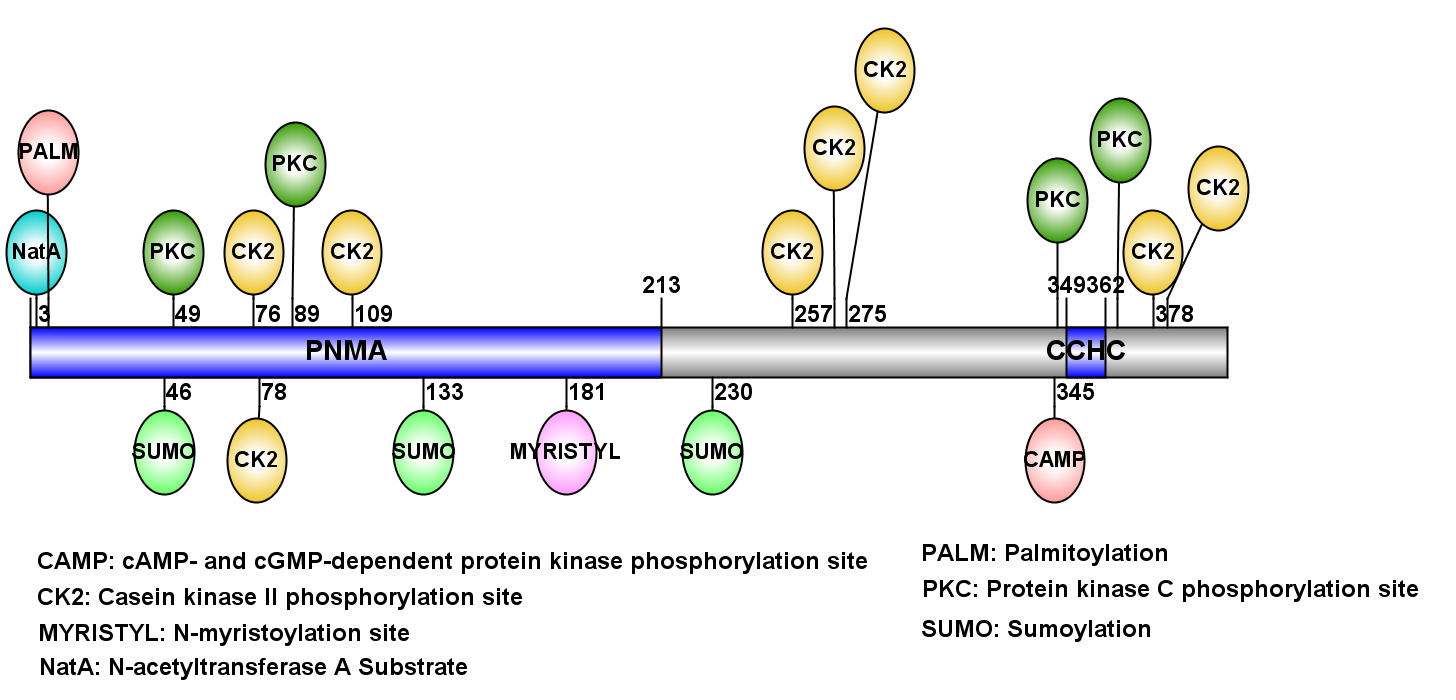
Predicted post translation modifications of human ZCCHC18

The predicted post-translational modifications (PTMs) is obtained by using Prosite, and many other tools. The key post translation modifications are summarized here.

=== Subcellular localization ===
ZCCHC18 primary locates in the nucleus (appearance to be nuclear speck, a discrete extra-nucleolar subnuclear domain, under immunofluorescence microscopy).

=== Function ===
Amino acid sequence of zinc finger CCHC-type in retroviral nucleocapsid proteins

Although the exact function of ZCCHC18 is still not fully known, the basic amino acid sequence of the zinc finger (Znf) CCHC-type protein can be well characterized as conservatively spaced cysteine and histidine. The Cys and His residues is completely conserved at position 1 (Cys), 4 (Cys), 9 (His), and 14 (Cys) [as the first Cys of the sequence labeled as Cys (1)]. Conservatively substituted glycines occur at position 5 and 8, and aromatic or hydrophobic amino acids are at positions 2 (or 3) and 10. This motif is often expressed as Cys-X2-Cys-X4-His-X4-Cys.

The structure of zinc finger domains enables the protein to make tandem contact with target molecules through multiple finger-like protrusions. These domains can bind to zinc or other metals such as iron, or even no metal (stabilizing through salt bridges). The exact mechanism for how the Znf domain of ZCCHC18 work is still unknown.

=== Interacting proteins ===
ZCCHC18 can possibly interact with the intracellular domain of EGFR. This report was based on the two protein-protein interaction (PPI) approaches, the membrane yeast two-hybrid (MYTH) and the mammalian membrane two-hybrid (MMTH), to map the PPIs between human receptor tyrosine kinases (RTKs) and phosphatases.

== Clinical significance ==
=== Disease association ===
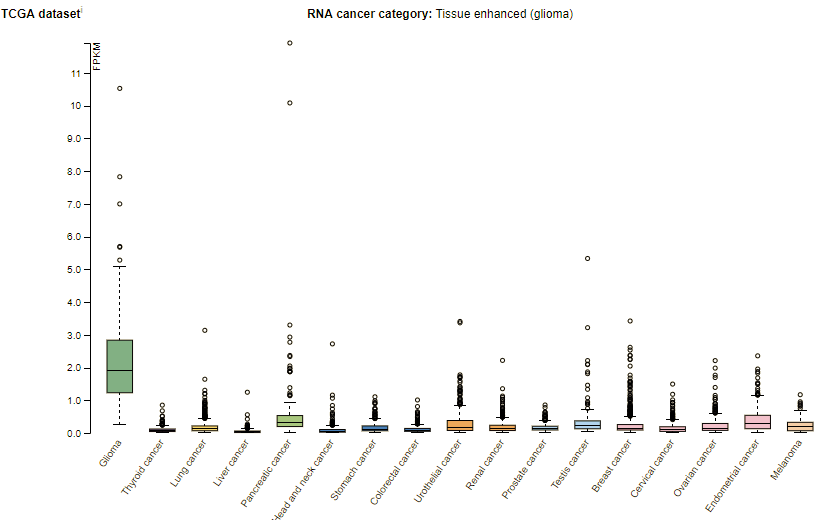
RNA Expression of ZCCHC18 in different cancer types from TCGA dataset

By examining RNA-seq data from The Cancer Genome Atlas (TCGA), glioma has enhanced RNA expression (median 1.9 FPKM [Fragments Per Kilobase of exon per Million reads]) whereas other cancer types only have minimal expression (median expression level lower than 0.5 FPKM). In terms of the ZCCHC18 protein expression, squamous and basal cell carcinomas, and cases of urothelial cancers exhibited moderate to strong cytoplasmic immunoreactivity. Remaining cancer cells were weakly stained or negative. While interrogating 4440 tumor samples from 15 cancer types from TCGA, the analysis showed a vary protein mutation frequency in different cancer types. ZCCHC18 mutation happened frequently in endometrial cancer (~ 2.4%), followed by bladder cancer (~0.8%), head/neck carcinoma (~0.4%), ovarian cancer (~0.4%), and breast cancer (<0.2%).

=== Genetic testing ===
As of May 2021, Fulgent Genetics was the only commercial company that provided the genetic testing for deletion or duplication of ZCCHC18 through sequence analysis of the entire coding region (Next-Generation Sequencing) for possible diseases caused by mutations on this particular gene that are inherited from a parent's genome. However, the clinical validity and utility have not been proven yet.
