= KRT33B =

Protein-coding gene in the species Homo sapiens

Identifiers
- Aliases: KRT33B, HA3II, Ha-3II, K33B, KRTHA3A, KRTHA3B, hHa3-II, keratin 33B
- External IDs: OMIM: 602762; MGI: 1919138; GeneCards: KRT33B

Gene location (Human)
Chr.	Chromosome 17 (human)
Band	17q21.2	Start	41,363,498 bp
Band	17q21.2	End	41,369,813 bp

Gene location (Mouse)
Chr.	Chromosome 11 (mouse)
Band	11|11 D	Start	99,902,021 bp
Band	11|11 D	End	99,907,038 bp
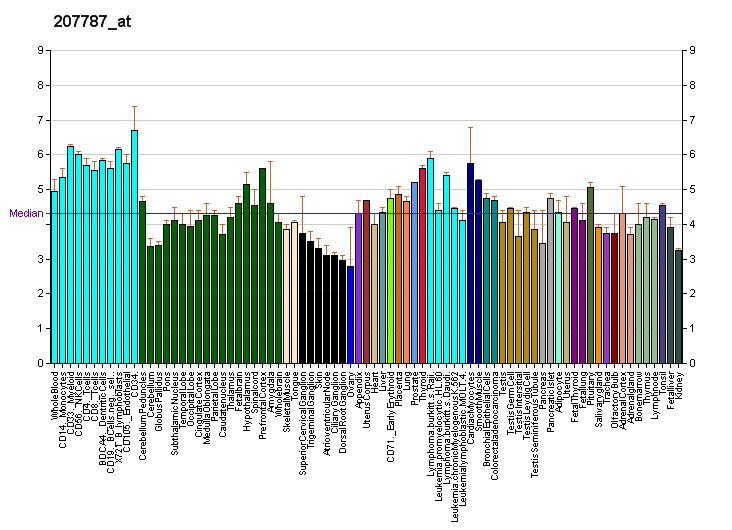
RNA expression pattern
Bgee	Human / Mouse (ortholog); Top expressed in: prefrontal cortex; anterior cingulate cortex; skin of abdomen; skin of leg; Brodmann area 9; right lung; mucosa of esophagus; right frontal lobe; vagina; hippocampus proper / Top expressed in: lip; hair follicle; skin of back; dermis; skin of external ear; skin of abdomen; sexually immature organism; medial head of gastrocnemius muscle; conjunctival fornix; diencephalon; More reference expression data
BioGPS	More reference expression data
Gene ontology
Molecular function	protein binding; structural molecule activity
Cellular component	extracellular exosome; intermediate filament; extracellular space; cytosol
Biological process	hair cycle; ageing; keratinization; cornification
Sources:Amigo / QuickGO
Orthologs
Databases	NCBI: entry; OMA: entry
Species	Human	Mouse
Entrez	3884	71888
Ensembl	ENSG00000263012; ENSG00000131738	ENSMUSG00000035592
UniProt	Q14525	Q8K0Y2
RefSeq (mRNA)	NM_002279	NM_027983
RefSeq (protein)	NP_002270	NP_082259
Location (UCSC)	Chr 17: 41.36 – 41.37 Mb	Chr 11: 99.9 – 99.91 Mb
PubMed search
- Wikidata
View/Edit Human	View/Edit Mouse

Keratin, type I cuticular Ha3-II is a protein that in humans is encoded by the KRT33B gene.

The protein encoded by this gene is a member of the keratin gene family. It is one of the type I hair keratin genes which are clustered in a region of chromosome 17q21.2 and have the same direction of transcription. As a type I hair keratin, it is an acidic protein which heterodimerizes with type II hair keratin to form hair and nails. There are two isoforms of this protein, encoded by two separate genes, KRT33A and KRT33B (this gene).
