= KRT33A =

Protein-coding gene in the species Homo sapiens

Identifiers
- Aliases: KRT33A, HA3I, Ha-3I, K33A, KRTHA3A, Krt1-3, hHa3-I, keratin 33A
- External IDs: OMIM: 602761; MGI: 1919138; GeneCards: KRT33A

Gene location (Human)
Chr.	Chromosome 17 (human)
Band	17q21.2	Start	41,346,092 bp
Band	17q21.2	End	41,350,828 bp

Gene location (Mouse)
Chr.	Chromosome 11 (mouse)
Band	11|11 D	Start	99,902,021 bp
Band	11|11 D	End	99,907,038 bp
RNA expression pattern
Bgee	Human / Mouse (ortholog); Top expressed in: testicle; mucosa of esophagus; left testis; right testis; skin of abdomen; vagina; skin of leg; minor salivary glands; right lung; ectocervix / Top expressed in: lip; hair follicle; skin of back; dermis; skin of external ear; skin of abdomen; sexually immature organism; medial head of gastrocnemius muscle; conjunctival fornix; diencephalon; More reference expression data
BioGPS	n/a
Gene ontology
Molecular function	structural molecule activity
Cellular component	intermediate filament; extracellular space; cytosol
Biological process	keratinization; cornification
Sources:Amigo / QuickGO
Orthologs
Databases	NCBI: entry; OMA: entry
Species	Human	Mouse
Entrez	3883	71888
Ensembl	ENSG00000261986; ENSG00000006059	ENSMUSG00000035592
UniProt	O76009	Q8K0Y2
RefSeq (mRNA)	NM_004138	NM_027983
RefSeq (protein)	NP_004129	NP_082259
Location (UCSC)	Chr 17: 41.35 – 41.35 Mb	Chr 11: 99.9 – 99.91 Mb
PubMed search
- Wikidata
View/Edit Human	View/Edit Mouse

Keratin, type I cuticular Ha3-I is a protein that in humans is encoded by the KRT33A gene.

The protein encoded by this gene is a member of the keratin gene family. It is one of the type I hair keratin genes which are clustered in a region of chromosome 17q21.2 and have the same direction of transcription. As a type I hair keratin, it is an acidic protein which heterodimerizes with type II keratins to form hair and nails. There are two isoforms of this protein, encoded by two separate genes, KRT33A (this gene) and KRT33B.
