= Keratin =

Structural fibrous protein

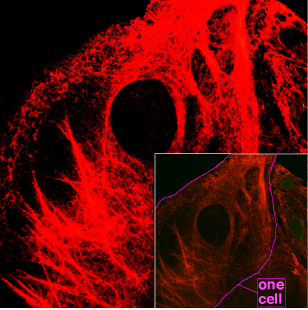
Microscopy of keratin filaments inside cells

Keratin (/ˈkɛrətɪn/) is one of a family of structural fibrous proteins also known as scleroproteins. It is the key structural material making up scales, hair, nails, feathers, horns, claws, hooves, and the outer layer of skin in tetrapod vertebrates. Keratin also protects epithelial cells from damage or stress. Keratin is extremely insoluble in water and organic solvents. Keratin monomers assemble into bundles to form intermediate filaments, which are tough and form strong unmineralized epidermal appendages found in reptiles, birds, amphibians, and mammals. Excessive keratinization participate in fortification of certain tissues such as in horns of cattle and rhinos, and armadillos' osteoderm. The only other biological matter known to approximate the toughness of keratinized tissue is chitin. Keratin comes in two types: the primitive, softer forms found in all vertebrates and the harder, derived forms found only among sauropsids (reptiles and birds).

== Examples of occurrence ==
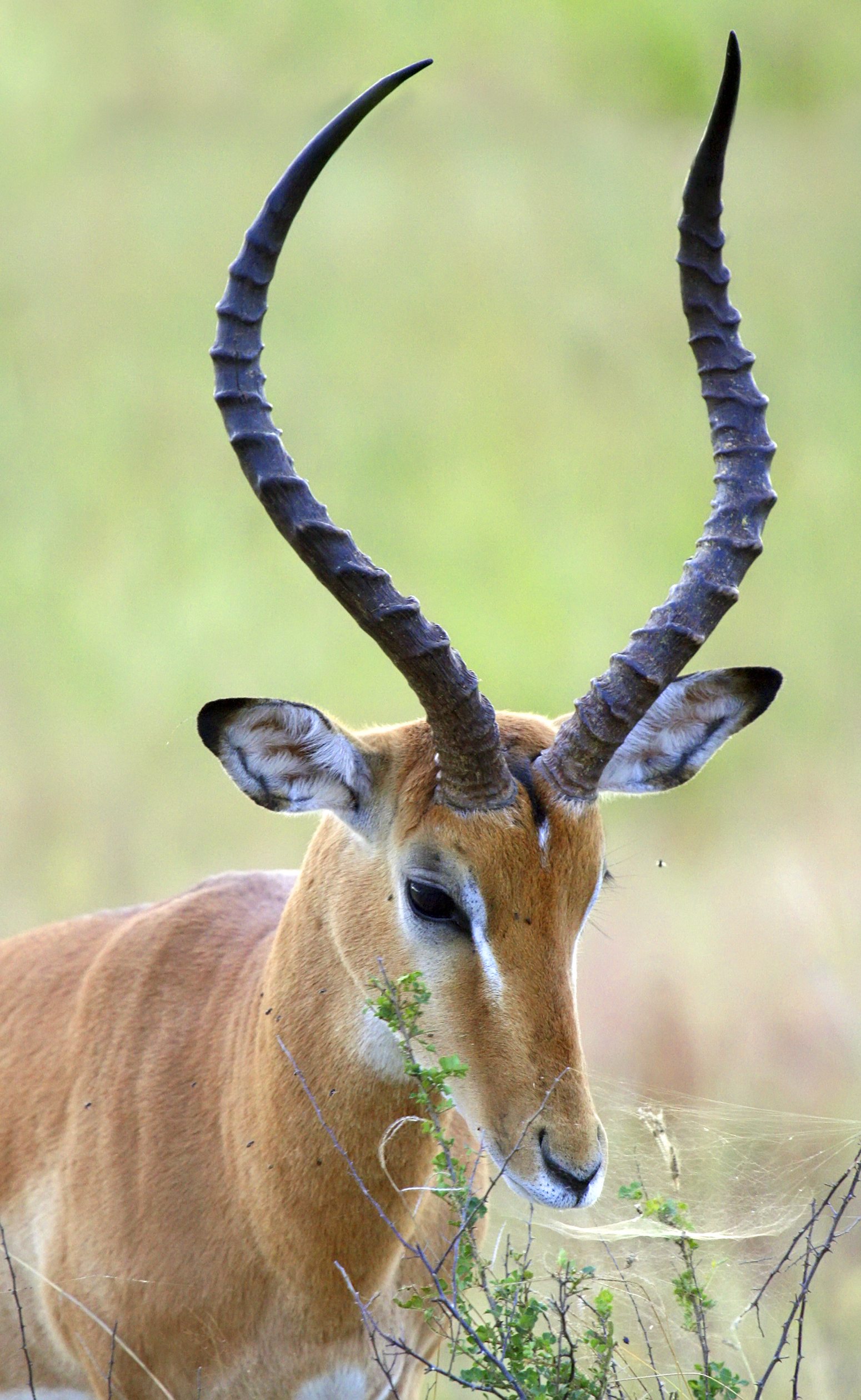
The horns of the impala are made of keratin covering a core of bone.

Alpha-keratins (α-keratins) are found in all vertebrates. They form the hair (including wool), the outer layer of skin, horns, nails, claws and hooves of mammals, and the slime threads of hagfish. The baleen plates of filter-feeding whales are also made of keratin. Keratin filaments are abundant in keratinocytes in the hornified layer of the epidermis; these are proteins which have undergone keratinization. They are also present in epithelial cells in general. For example, mouse thymic epithelial cells react with antibodies for keratin 5, keratin 8, and keratin 14. These antibodies are used as fluorescent markers to distinguish subsets of mouse thymic epithelial cells in genetic studies of the thymus.

The harder beta-keratins (β-keratins) are found only in the sauropsids, i.e., all living reptiles and birds. They are found in the nails, scales, and claws of reptiles, in some reptile shells (Testudines), and in the feathers, beaks, and claws of birds. These keratins are formed primarily in beta sheets. However, beta sheets are also found in α-keratins. Recent scholarship has shown that sauropsid β-keratins are fundamentally different from α-keratins at a genetic and structural level. The new term corneous beta protein (CBP) has been proposed to avoid confusion with α-keratins.

Keratins (also described as cytokeratins) are polymers of type I and type II intermediate filaments that have been found only in chordates (vertebrates, amphioxi, urochordates). Nematodes and many other non-chordate animals seem to have only type V intermediate filaments, fibers that structure the nucleus.

== Genes ==
The neutral–basic keratins are encoded on chromosome 12 (12q13.13).

The acidic keratins are encoded on chromosome 17 (17q21.2).

The human genome encodes 54 functional keratin genes, located in two clusters on chromosomes 12 and 17. This suggests that they originated from a series of gene duplications on these chromosomes.

The keratins include the following proteins of which KRT23, KRT24, KRT25, KRT26, KRT27, KRT28, KRT31, KRT32, KRT33A, KRT33B, KRT34, KRT35, KRT36, KRT37, KRT38, KRT39, KRT40, KRT71, KRT72, KRT73, KRT74, KRT75, KRT76, KRT77, KRT78, KRT79, KRT80, KRT81, KRT82, KRT83, KRT84, KRT85 and KRT86 have been used to describe keratins past 20.

Table of keratin genes and biological processes (GeneCards)
Symbol	Biological process
KRT1	complement activation, lectin pathway
KRT1	retina homeostasis
KRT1	response to oxidative stress
KRT1	peptide cross-linking
KRT1	keratinization
KRT1	fibrinolysis
KRT1	intermediate filament organization
KRT1	regulation of angiogenesis
KRT1	negative regulation of inflammatory response
KRT1	protein heterotetramerization
KRT1	establishment of skin barrier
KRT10	morphogenesis of an epithelium
KRT10	epidermis development
KRT10	peptide cross-linking
KRT10	keratinocyte differentiation
KRT10	epithelial cell differentiation
KRT10	positive regulation of epidermis development
KRT10	protein heterotetramerization
KRT12	morphogenesis of an epithelium
KRT12	visual perception
KRT12	epidermis development
KRT12	epithelial cell differentiation
KRT12	cornea development in camera-type eye
KRT13	cytoskeleton organization
KRT13	epithelial cell differentiation
KRT13	regulation of translation in response to stress
KRT13	intermediate filament organization
KRT14	aging
KRT14	epidermis development
KRT14	keratinocyte differentiation
KRT14	epithelial cell differentiation
KRT14	hair cycle
KRT14	intermediate filament organization
KRT14	intermediate filament bundle assembly
KRT14	stem cell differentiation
KRT15	epidermis development
KRT15	epithelial cell differentiation
KRT15	intermediate filament organization
KRT16	morphogenesis of an epithelium
KRT16	inflammatory response
KRT16	cytoskeleton organization
KRT16	aging
KRT16	keratinocyte differentiation
KRT16	negative regulation of cell migration
KRT16	epithelial cell differentiation
KRT16	keratinization
KRT16	hair cycle
KRT16	innate immune response
KRT16	intermediate filament cytoskeleton organization
KRT16	intermediate filament organization
KRT16	keratinocyte migration
KRT16	establishment of skin barrier
KRT17	morphogenesis of an epithelium
KRT17	positive regulation of cell growth
KRT17	epithelial cell differentiation
KRT17	hair follicle morphogenesis
KRT17	keratinization
KRT17	intermediate filament organization
KRT17	positive regulation of translation
KRT17	positive regulation of hair follicle development
KRT18	cell cycle
KRT18	anatomical structure morphogenesis
KRT18	tumor necrosis factor-mediated signaling pathway
KRT18	obsolete Golgi to plasma membrane CFTR protein transport
KRT18	Golgi to plasma membrane protein transport
KRT18	negative regulation of apoptotic process
KRT18	intermediate filament cytoskeleton organization
KRT18	extrinsic apoptotic signaling pathway
KRT18	hepatocyte apoptotic process
KRT18	cell-cell adhesion
KRT19	Notch signaling pathway
KRT19	epithelial cell differentiation
KRT19	response to estrogen
KRT19	intermediate filament organization
KRT19	sarcomere organization
KRT19	cell differentiation involved in embryonic placenta development
KRT2	keratinocyte development
KRT2	epidermis development
KRT2	peptide cross-linking
KRT2	keratinization
KRT2	keratinocyte activation
KRT2	keratinocyte proliferation
KRT2	intermediate filament organization
KRT2	positive regulation of epidermis development
KRT2	keratinocyte migration
KRT20	apoptotic process
KRT20	cellular response to starvation
KRT20	epithelial cell differentiation
KRT20	intermediate filament organization
KRT20	regulation of protein secretion
KRT23	epithelial cell differentiation
KRT23	intermediate filament organization
KRT24	biological_process
KRT25	cytoskeleton organization
KRT25	aging
KRT25	hair follicle morphogenesis
KRT25	hair cycle
KRT25	intermediate filament organization
KRT26	
KRT27	biological_process
KRT27	hair follicle morphogenesis
KRT27	intermediate filament organization
KRT28	biological_process
KRT3	epithelial cell differentiation
KRT3	keratinization
KRT3	intermediate filament cytoskeleton organization
KRT3	intermediate filament organization
KRT31	epidermis development
KRT31	epithelial cell differentiation
KRT31	intermediate filament organization
KRT32	epidermis development
KRT32	epithelial cell differentiation
KRT32	intermediate filament organization
KRT33A	epithelial cell differentiation
KRT33A	intermediate filament organization
KRT33B	aging
KRT33B	epithelial cell differentiation
KRT33B	hair cycle
KRT33B	intermediate filament organization
KRT34	epidermis development
KRT34	epithelial cell differentiation
KRT34	intermediate filament organization
KRT35	anatomical structure morphogenesis
KRT35	epithelial cell differentiation
KRT35	intermediate filament organization
KRT36	biological_process
KRT36	epithelial cell differentiation
KRT36	intermediate filament organization
KRT36	regulation of keratinocyte differentiation
KRT37	epithelial cell differentiation
KRT37	intermediate filament organization
KRT38	epithelial cell differentiation
KRT38	intermediate filament organization
KRT39	epithelial cell differentiation
KRT39	intermediate filament organization
KRT4	cytoskeleton organization
KRT4	epithelial cell differentiation
KRT4	keratinization
KRT4	intermediate filament organization
KRT4	negative regulation of epithelial cell proliferation
KRT40	epithelial cell differentiation
KRT40	intermediate filament organization
KRT5	epidermis development
KRT5	response to mechanical stimulus
KRT5	regulation of cell migration
KRT5	keratinization
KRT5	regulation of protein localization
KRT5	intermediate filament polymerization
KRT5	intermediate filament organization
KRT6A	obsolete negative regulation of cytolysis by symbiont of host cells
KRT6A	morphogenesis of an epithelium
KRT6A	positive regulation of cell population proliferation
KRT6A	cell differentiation
KRT6A	keratinization
KRT6A	wound healing
KRT6A	intermediate filament organization
KRT6A	defense response to Gram-positive bacterium
KRT6A	cytolysis by host of symbiont cells
KRT6A	antimicrobial humoral immune response mediated by antimicrobial peptide
KRT6A	negative regulation of entry of bacterium into host cell
KRT6B	ectoderm development
KRT6B	keratinization
KRT6B	intermediate filament organization
KRT6C	keratinization
KRT6C	intermediate filament cytoskeleton organization
KRT6C	intermediate filament organization
KRT7	keratinization
KRT7	intermediate filament organization
KRT71	hair follicle morphogenesis
KRT71	keratinization
KRT71	intermediate filament organization
KRT72	biological_process
KRT72	keratinization
KRT72	intermediate filament organization
KRT73	biological_process
KRT73	keratinization
KRT73	intermediate filament organization
KRT74	keratinization
KRT74	intermediate filament cytoskeleton organization
KRT74	intermediate filament organization
KRT75	hematopoietic progenitor cell differentiation
KRT75	keratinization
KRT75	intermediate filament organization
KRT76	cytoskeleton organization
KRT76	epidermis development
KRT76	keratinization
KRT76	pigmentation
KRT76	intermediate filament organization
KRT76	sebaceous gland development
KRT77	biological_process
KRT77	keratinization
KRT77	intermediate filament organization
KRT78	keratinization
KRT78	intermediate filament organization
KRT79	keratinization
KRT79	intermediate filament organization
KRT8	keratinization
KRT8	tumor necrosis factor-mediated signaling pathway
KRT8	intermediate filament organization
KRT8	sarcomere organization
KRT8	response to hydrostatic pressure
KRT8	response to other organism
KRT8	cell differentiation involved in embryonic placenta development
KRT8	extrinsic apoptotic signaling pathway
KRT8	hepatocyte apoptotic process
KRT80	keratinization
KRT80	intermediate filament organization
KRT81	keratinization
KRT81	intermediate filament organization
KRT82	biological_process
KRT82	keratinization
KRT82	intermediate filament organization
KRT83	aging
KRT83	epidermis development
KRT83	keratinization
KRT83	hair cycle
KRT83	intermediate filament organization
KRT84	hair follicle development
KRT84	keratinization
KRT84	nail development
KRT84	intermediate filament organization
KRT84	regulation of keratinocyte differentiation
KRT85	epidermis development
KRT85	keratinization
KRT85	intermediate filament organization
KRT86	keratinization
KRT86	intermediate filament organization
KRT9	spermatogenesis
KRT9	epidermis development
KRT9	epithelial cell differentiation
KRT9	skin development
KRT9	intermediate filament organization

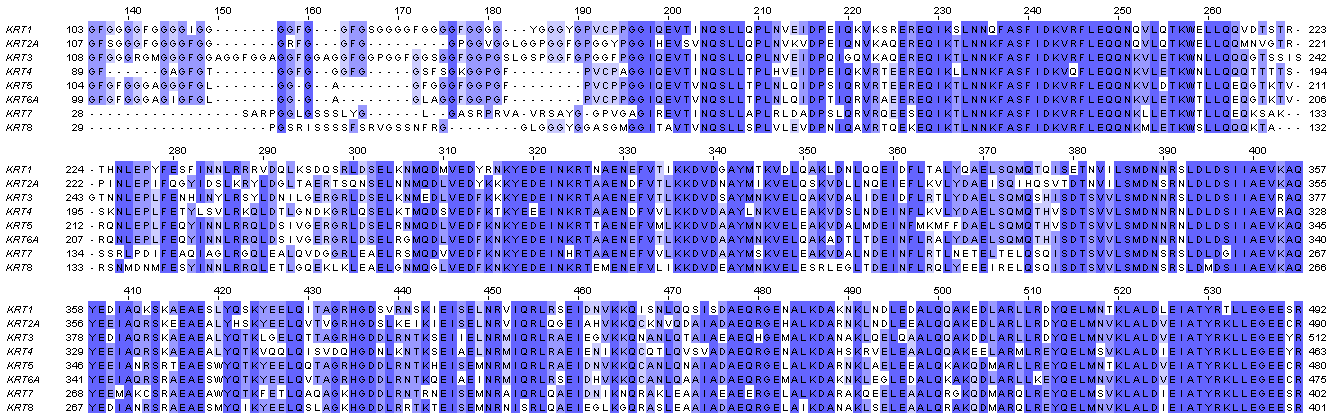
Protein sequence alignment of human keratin 1, 2A, 3,4, 5, 6A, 7, and 8 (KRT1 – KRT8). Only the first rod domain is shown above. Alignment was created using Clustal Omega.

== Protein structure ==
The first sequences of keratins were determined by Israel Hanukoglu and Elaine Fuchs (1982, 1983). These sequences revealed that there are two distinct but homologous keratin families, which were named type I and type II keratins. By analysis of the primary structures of these keratins and other intermediate filament proteins, Hanukoglu and Fuchs suggested a model in which keratins and intermediate filament proteins contain a central ~310 residue domain with four segments in α-helical conformation that are separated by three short linker segments predicted to be in beta-turn conformation. This model has been confirmed by the determination of the crystal structure of a helical domain of keratins.

=== Type I and II keratins ===
The human genome has 54 functional annotated keratin genes, of which 28 are type I keratins and 26 are type II keratins.

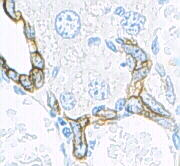
Keratin (high molecular weight) in bile duct cell and oval cells of horse liver.

Fibrous keratin molecules supercoil to form a very stable, left-handed superhelical motif to multimerise, forming filaments consisting of multiple copies of the keratin monomer.

The major force that keeps the coiled-coil structure is hydrophobic interactions between apolar residues along the keratin's helical segments.

The keratin supercoil shape has limited space in the interior of the coil. This size restriction is balanced in keratin by a high frequency of glycine residues, the smallest protein amino-acid. A high frequency of glycine residues is also seen in collagen structural proteins, which also feature a size-constrained helical shape. The connective tissue protein elastin also has a high percentage of both glycine and alanine. A preponderance of amino acids with small, nonreactive side groups is characteristic of structural proteins, for which H-bonded close packing is more important than chemical specificity.

=== Disulfide bridges ===
In addition to intra- and intermolecular hydrogen bonds, the distinguishing feature of keratins is the presence of large amounts of the sulfur-containing amino acid cysteine, required for the disulfide bridges that confer additional strength and rigidity by permanent, thermally stable crosslinking—in much the same way that non-protein sulfur bridges stabilize vulcanized rubber. Human hair is approximately 14% cysteine. The pungent smells of burning hair and skin are due to the volatile sulfur compounds formed. Extensive disulfide bonding contributes to the insolubility of keratins, except in a small number of solvents such as dissociating or reducing agents.

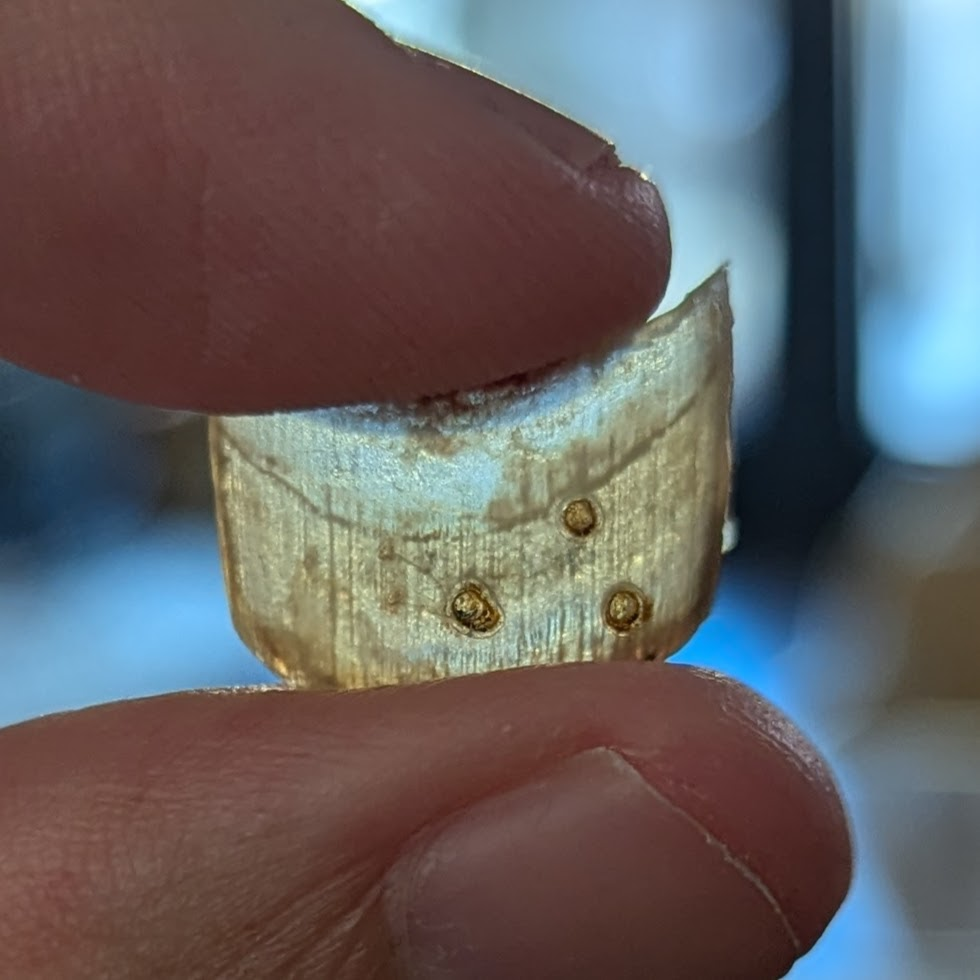
A human toenail that fell off after a small trauma.

The more flexible and elastic keratins of hair have fewer interchain disulfide bridges than the keratins in mammalian fingernails, hooves and claws (homologous structures), which are harder and more like their analogs in other vertebrate classes. Hair and other α-keratins consist of α-helically coiled single protein strands (with regular intra-chain H-bonding), which are then further twisted into superhelical ropes that may be further coiled. The β-keratins of reptiles and birds have β-pleated sheets twisted together, then stabilized and hardened by disulfide bridges.

Thiolated polymers (thiomers) can form disulfide bridges with cysteine substructures of keratins getting covalently attached to these proteins. Thiomers therefore exhibit high binding properties to keratins found in hair, on skin and on the surface of many cell types.

=== Filament formation ===
It has been proposed that keratins can be divided into 'hard' and 'soft' forms, or 'cytokeratins' and 'other keratins'. That model is now understood to be correct. A new nuclear addition in 2006 to describe keratins takes this into account.

Keratin filaments are intermediate filaments. Like all intermediate filaments, keratin proteins form filamentous polymers in a series of assembly steps beginning with dimerization; dimers assemble into tetramers and octamers and eventually, if the current hypothesis holds, into unit-length-filaments (ULF) capable of annealing end-to-end into long filaments.

=== Pairing ===
A (neutral-basic)	B (acidic)	Occurrence
keratin 1, keratin 2	keratin 9, keratin 10	stratum corneum, keratinocytes
keratin 3	keratin 12	cornea
keratin 4	keratin 13	stratified epithelium
keratin 5	keratin 14, keratin 15	stratified epithelium
keratin 6	keratin 16, keratin 17	squamous epithelium
keratin 7	keratin 19	ductal epithelia
keratin 8	keratin 18, keratin 20	simple epithelium

== Cornification ==
Cornification is the process of forming an epidermal barrier in stratified squamous epithelial tissue. At the cellular level, cornification is characterised by:

- production of keratin
- production of small proline-rich (SPRR) proteins and transglutaminase which eventually form a cornified cell envelope beneath the plasma membrane
- terminal differentiation
- loss of nuclei and organelles, in the final stages of cornification

Metabolism ceases, and the cells are almost completely filled by keratin. During the process of epithelial differentiation, cells become cornified as keratin protein is incorporated into longer keratin intermediate filaments. Eventually the nucleus and cytoplasmic organelles disappear, metabolism ceases and cells undergo a programmed death as they become fully keratinized. In many other cell types, such as cells of the dermis, keratin filaments and other intermediate filaments function as part of the cytoskeleton to mechanically stabilize the cell against physical stress. It does this through connections to desmosomes, cell–cell junctional plaques, and hemidesmosomes, cell-basement membrane adhesive structures.

Cells in the epidermis contain a structural matrix of keratin, which makes this outermost layer of the skin almost waterproof, and along with collagen and elastin gives skin its strength. Rubbing and pressure cause thickening of the outer, cornified layer of the epidermis and forms protective calluses, which are useful for athletes and on the fingertips of musicians who play stringed instruments. Keratinized epidermal cells are constantly shed and replaced.

These hard, integumentary structures are formed by intercellular cementing of fibers formed from the dead, cornified cells generated by specialized beds deep within the skin. Hair grows continuously and feathers molt and regenerate. The constituent proteins may be phylogenetically homologous but differ somewhat in chemical structure and supermolecular organization. The evolutionary relationships are complex and only partially known. Multiple genes have been identified for the β-keratins in feathers, and this is probably characteristic of all keratins.

== Clinical significance ==
Abnormal growth of keratin can occur in a variety of conditions including keratosis, hyperkeratosis and keratoderma.

Mutations in keratin gene expression can lead to, among others:

- Alopecia areata
- Epidermolysis bullosa simplex
- Ichthyosis bullosa of Siemens
- Epidermolytic hyperkeratosis
- Steatocystoma multiplex
- Keratosis pharyngis
- Rhabdoid cell formation in large cell lung carcinoma with rhabdoid phenotype

Several diseases, such as athlete's foot and ringworm, are caused by infectious fungi that feed on keratin.

Keratin is highly resistant to digestive acids if ingested. Cats regularly ingest hair as part of their grooming behavior, leading to the gradual formation of hairballs that may be expelled orally or excreted. In humans, trichophagia may lead to Rapunzel syndrome, an extremely rare but potentially fatal intestinal condition.

=== Diagnostic use ===
Keratin expression is helpful in determining epithelial origin in anaplastic cancers. Tumors that express keratin include carcinomas, thymomas, sarcomas and trophoblastic neoplasms. Furthermore, the precise expression-pattern of keratin subtypes allows prediction of the origin of the primary tumor when assessing metastases. For example, hepatocellular carcinomas typically express CK8 and CK18, and cholangiocarcinomas express CK7, CK8 and CK18, while metastases of colorectal carcinomas express CK20, but not CK7.

== See also ==
- Keratin-associated proteins (KRTAPs)
- List of cutaneous conditions caused by mutations in keratins
- List of keratins expressed in the human integumentary system
- List of keratins
- Keratinase
