= Keratosis pharyngis =

- Specialty: Otolaryngologist

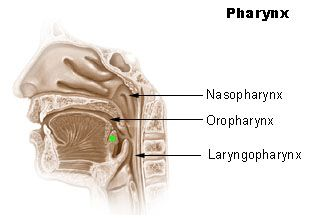
Displayed here is the pharynx where keratin tissues grows on its surface.

Keratosis Pharyngis is a medical condition where keratin grows on the surface of the pharynx, that is the part of the throat at the back of the mouth. Keratin is a protein that normally occurs as the main component of hair and nails. It is characterized by the presence of whitish-yellow dots on the pharyngeal wall, tonsils or lingual tonsils. They are firmly adherent and cannot be wiped off. The surrounding region does not show any sign or inflammation or any other symptoms that make affect the rest of the body.

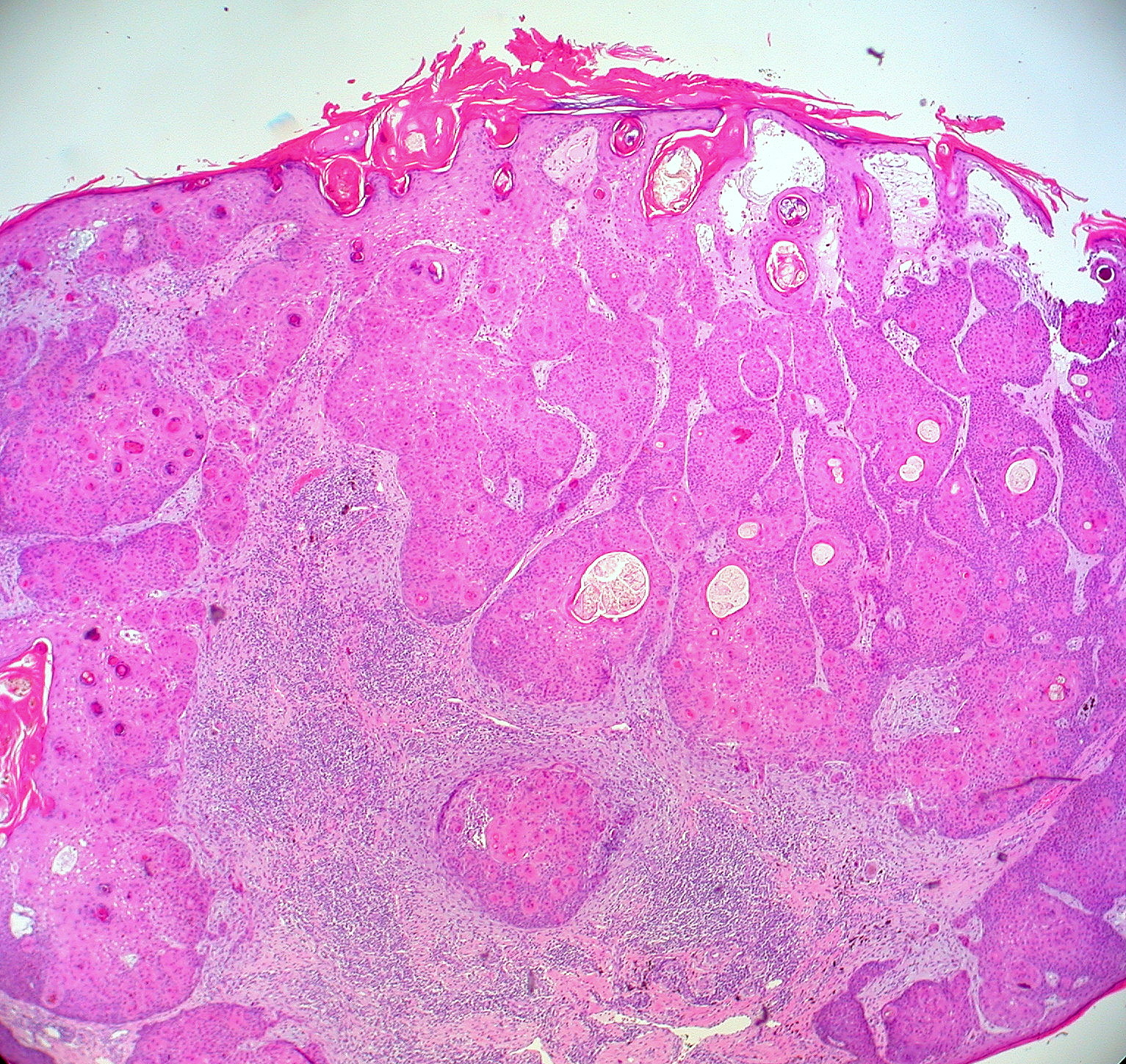
Microscopic view of keratin tissue

== Signs and symptoms ==
Signs and symptoms of an individual with this condition will display horny excrescences on the surface of the tonsils, pharyngeal wall, or lingual tonsils. They appear as white or yellowish dots (projections). These excrescences are the result of hypertrophy and keratinization of epithelium. These so-called "dots" are firmly adherent to the area in which they reside and cannot be wiped off. There is no accompanying inflammation or any constitutional symptoms thus, it can be easily differentiated from acute follicular tonsillitis. There is no pain involved however, some discomfort or irritation of the throat may be felt. Removing the tonsils altogether may be a better option if irritation and discomfort is unbearable.

- Discomfort
- Painful swallowing
- Irritation of the throat

== Causes ==
There is no specific cause of this disease. Epithelial and fungal debris collects in the follicles in the pharynx which could be a sign of a potential cause. The main thing to know about this condition is that it can reappear.

== Diagnosis ==
An ENT specialist or otolaryngologist will be able to confirm the diagnosis as well as provide any necessary treatment if required. The ENT will use an instrument called a laryngoscope in order to push the tongue down and in order to lift up the epiglottis which is the small flap in the back of the throat that covers the windpipe. The epiglottis opens during breathing but closes during swallowing in order to prevent choking. The ENT will then use an instrument to remove any visible small growths or they will use a swab to sweep over the growth and send it to a lab where it can be examined for further testing.

== Mechanism/Pathophysiology ==
A microscopic examination of the swab test that is taken from the walls of the pharynx will reveal thickened, keratinized, squamous epithelium and may appear lobulated pedunculate. The sizes may vary from small to large. A larger growth or an accumulation of small growth can determine how a person may feel since any growth can be uncomfortable in the back of the throat. This is determined to be one of the main contributions of this condition.

== Prevention/Treatment ==
This disease may show spontaneous regression and may not require any specific treatment except for reassurance to the patient. To aide with any discomfort, gargling or taking lozenges would be temporarily beneficial. Avoid smoking or tobacco usage at all costs. Removing the tonsils altogether would be a last resort procedure if all else fails.

== Prognosis ==
There is no prognosis due to the rarity of this condition. Keratosis pharynges appears without an apparent cause and disappears spontaneously with or without treatment. Most cases usually go away on their own. There is no long-term impact of this condition and although reoccurrence can occur, it is actually very rare. The disease usually shows spontaneous regression.

== Epidemiology ==
Due to a lack of awareness and studies, prevalence in a particular population or sex is unknown.

== Research ==
There is very little research on this condition. One patient who was diagnosed with Keratosis Pharyngis had white spots on the base of the tongue and on the pharynx, and hurt a little when swallowing. No treatment was found to help, but the condition went away by itself eventually. A similar study was conducted about keratin expression in normal esophageal epithelium and squamous cell carcinoma of the esophagus. To sum it up, the molecular weight was taken of squamous cell carcinoma in the esophagus and normal esophageal epithelium using a immunoblot analysis The squamous tissue which had keratins weighed more than the normal epithelium.

Future research can be conducted in a similar way as the above study had done. A swab of the keratin growth in the pharynx can be compared to the regular tissue in the pharynx. This can determine many differences under a microscope.

== See also ==
- Keratosis
