= ASH2L =

Protein-coding gene in the species Homo sapiens

Identifiers
- Aliases: ASH2L, ASH2, ASH2L1, ASH2L2, Bre2, ASH2 like histone lysine methyltransferase complex subunit, ASH2 like, histone lysine methyltransferase complex subunit
- External IDs: OMIM: 604782; MGI: 1344416; GeneCards: ASH2L
Available structures
PDB	Ortholog search: PDBe RCSB
PDB	List of PDB id codes 3RSN, 3S32, 3TOJ, 4RIQ, 4X8N, 4X8P, 5F6L, 5F6K

Gene location (Human)
Chr.	Chromosome 8 (human)
Band	8p11.23	Start	38,105,493 bp
Band	8p11.23	End	38,144,076 bp

Gene location (Mouse)
Chr.	Chromosome 8 (mouse)
Band	8|8 A2	Start	26,306,024 bp
Band	8|8 A2	End	26,337,722 bp
RNA expression pattern
Bgee	Human / Mouse (ortholog); Top expressed in: superficial temporal artery; germinal epithelium; gonad; trabecular bone; gingival epithelium; ventricular zone; tibialis anterior muscle; embryo; mucosa of paranasal sinus; right testis / Top expressed in: seminiferous tubule; spermatocyte; maxillary prominence; blastocyst; mandibular prominence; yolk sac; ventricular zone; medial ganglionic eminence; spermatid; abdominal wall; More reference expression data
BioGPS	n/a
Gene ontology
Molecular function	euchromatin binding; beta-catenin binding; histone methyltransferase activity (H3-K4 specific); metal ion binding; protein binding; histone-lysine N-methyltransferase activity; DNA binding
Cellular component	nucleoplasm; MLL1 complex; MLL3/4 complex; nucleus; histone methyltransferase complex; Set1C/COMPASS complex
Biological process	regulation of transcription, DNA-templated; transcription, DNA-templated; cellular response to DNA damage stimulus; response to estrogen; positive regulation of cell population proliferation; positive regulation of transcription by RNA polymerase II; beta-catenin-TCF complex assembly; regulation of megakaryocyte differentiation; histone H3-K4 methylation; chromatin organization; hemopoiesis
Sources:Amigo / QuickGO
Orthologs
Databases	NCBI: entry; OMA: entry
Species	Human	Mouse
Entrez	9070	23808
Ensembl	ENSG00000129691	ENSMUSG00000031575
UniProt	Q9UBL3	Q91X20
RefSeq (mRNA)	NM_001105214; NM_001261832; NM_001282272; NM_004674	NM_001080793; NM_001286207; NM_011791; NM_001359012
RefSeq (protein)	NP_001098684; NP_001248761; NP_001269201; NP_004665	NP_001074262; NP_001273136; NP_035921; NP_001345941
Location (UCSC)	Chr 8: 38.11 – 38.14 Mb	Chr 8: 26.31 – 26.34 Mb
PubMed search
- Wikidata
View/Edit Human	View/Edit Mouse

Set1/Ash2 histone methyltransferase complex subunit ASH2 is an enzyme that in humans is encoded by the ASH2L gene.

== Interactions ==
ASH2L has been shown to interact with MLL.
