= Kelch-like protein 20 =

Protein found in humans

KLHL20

Identifiers
- Aliases: KLHL20, KHLHX, KLEIP, KLHLX, kelch like family member 20
- External IDs: OMIM: 617679; MGI: 2444855; GeneCards: KLHL20

Gene location (Human)
Chr.	Chromosome 1 (human)
Band	1q25.1	Start	173,714,941 bp
Band	1q25.1	End	173,786,692 bp

Gene location (Mouse)
Chr.	Chromosome 1 (mouse)
Band	1|1 H2.1	Start	160,915,945 bp
Band	1|1 H2.1	End	160,959,081 bp
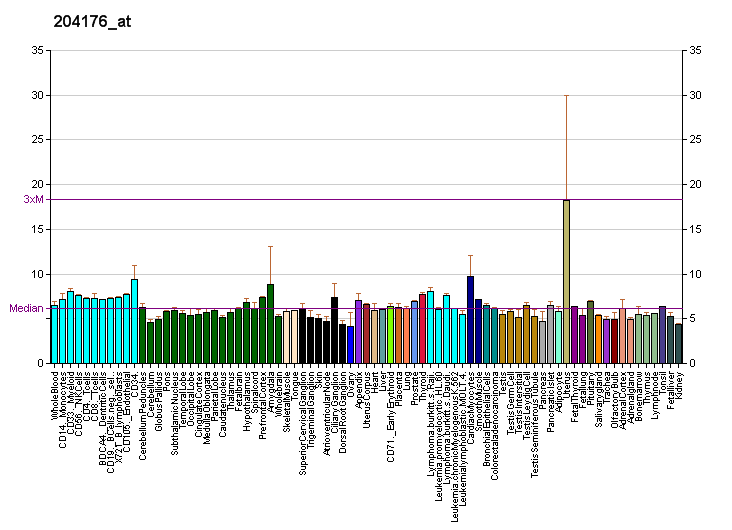

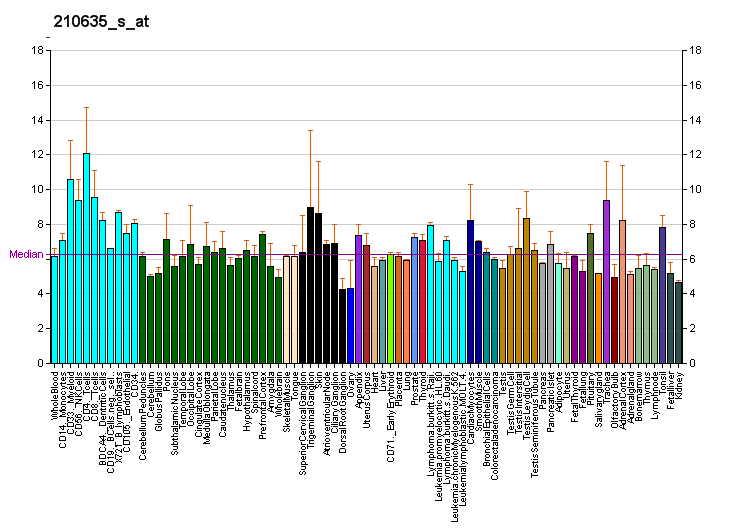

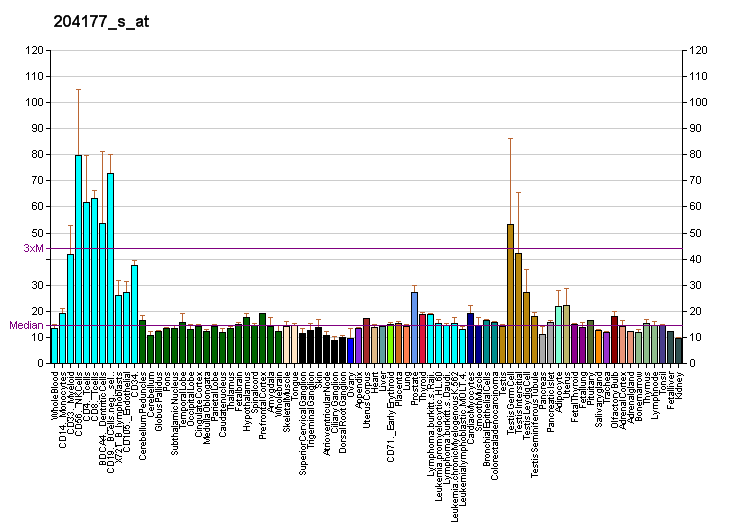
RNA expression pattern
Bgee	Human / Mouse (ortholog); Top expressed in: secondary oocyte; Achilles tendon; tendon of biceps brachii; sperm; gonad; nipple; popliteal artery; tibial arteries; ventricular zone; gallbladder / Top expressed in: facial motor nucleus; tail of embryo; endothelial cell of lymphatic vessel; cumulus cell; anterior horn of spinal cord; blood; genital tubercle; granulocyte; trigeminal ganglion; thymus; More reference expression data
BioGPS	More reference expression data
Gene ontology
Molecular function	ubiquitin-protein transferase activity; protein binding; interferon-gamma binding; actin binding
Cellular component	nucleus; cell projection; actin cytoskeleton; Cul3-RING ubiquitin ligase complex; perinuclear region of cytoplasm; dendrite; trans-Golgi network; axon; cytoplasm; Golgi apparatus; PML body; cytosol
Biological process	Golgi to endosome transport; protein K33-linked ubiquitination; cytoskeleton organization; protein transport; proteasome-mediated ubiquitin-dependent protein catabolic process; response to interferon-alpha; protein ubiquitination; negative regulation of apoptotic process; post-translational protein modification
Sources:Amigo / QuickGO
Orthologs
Databases	NCBI: entry; OMA: entry
Species	Human	Mouse
Entrez	27252	226541
Ensembl	ENSG00000076321	ENSMUSG00000026705
UniProt	Q9Y2M5	Q8VCK5
RefSeq (mRNA)	NM_014458	NM_001039482; NM_144876
RefSeq (protein)	NP_055273	NP_001034571
Location (UCSC)	Chr 1: 173.71 – 173.79 Mb	Chr 1: 160.92 – 160.96 Mb
PubMed search
- Wikidata
View/Edit Human	View/Edit Mouse

Kelch-like protein 20 is a protein that in humans is encoded by the KLHL20 gene.

The protein encoded by this gene is a member of the kelch family of proteins, which is characterized by a 44–56 amino acid repeat motif. The kelch motif appears in many different polypeptide contexts and contains multiple potential protein–protein contact sites. Members of this family are present both throughout the cell and extracellularly, with diverse activities.
