= KRT27 =

Protein-coding gene in the species Homo sapiens

Identifiers
- Aliases: KRT27, KRT25C, K25IRS3, keratin 27
- External IDs: OMIM: 616676; MGI: 1339999; GeneCards: KRT27

Gene location (Human)
Chr.	Chromosome 17 (human)
Band	17q21.2	Start	40,776,808 bp
Band	17q21.2	End	40,782,550 bp

Gene location (Mouse)
Chr.	Chromosome 11 (mouse)
Band	11 D|11 62.92 cM	Start	99,236,391 bp
Band	11 D|11 62.92 cM	End	99,241,930 bp
RNA expression pattern
Bgee	Human / Mouse (ortholog); Top expressed in: skin of arm; testicle; skin of hip; skin of leg; skin of abdomen; nipple; right lung; right coronary artery; mucosa of transverse colon; gallbladder / Top expressed in: hair follicle; lip; lumbar spinal ganglion; skin of back; skin of abdomen; embryo; lower jaw; Meckel's cartilage; skin of external ear; sexually immature organism; More reference expression data
BioGPS	n/a
Gene ontology
Molecular function	structural molecule activity; molecular function
Cellular component	cytoplasm; extracellular exosome; intermediate filament; cytosol
Biological process	hair follicle morphogenesis; keratinization; cornification; biological process
Sources:Amigo / QuickGO
Orthologs
Databases	NCBI: entry; OMA: entry
Species	Human	Mouse
Entrez	342574	16675
Ensembl	ENSG00000171446	ENSMUSG00000017588
UniProt	Q7Z3Y8	Q9Z320
RefSeq (mRNA)	NM_181537	NM_010666
RefSeq (protein)	NP_853515	NP_034796
Location (UCSC)	Chr 17: 40.78 – 40.78 Mb	Chr 11: 99.24 – 99.24 Mb
PubMed search
- Wikidata
View/Edit Human	View/Edit Mouse

Keratin, type I cytoskeletal 27 is a keratin belonging to the Type I family of intermediate filament proteins. In humans, in it encoded by a gene with symbol KRT27.
