= MKRN3 =

Protein-coding gene in the species Homo sapiens

Identifiers
- Aliases: MKRN3, CPPB2, D15S9, RNF63, ZFP127, ZNF127, makorin ring finger protein 3
- External IDs: OMIM: 603856; MGI: 2181178; GeneCards: MKRN3
Enzyme activity
| EC # | BRENDA | ExPASy | KEGG | MetaCyc |
|---|---|---|---|---|
| 2.3.2.27 | ↗ | ↗ | ↗ | ↗ |

Gene location (Human)
| Chr. | Chromosome 15 (human) |
| Band | 15q11.2 | Start | 23,565,674 bp |
| Band | 15q11.2 | End | 23,630,075 bp |

Gene location (Mouse)
| Chr. | Chromosome 7 (mouse) |
| Band | 7 C|7 34.37 cM | Start | 62,067,341 bp |
| Band | 7 C|7 34.37 cM | End | 62,069,887 bp |
RNA expression pattern
| Bgee | Human / Mouse (ortholog); Top expressed in: ganglionic eminence; testicle; ventricular zone; C1 segment; corpus callosum; amygdala; minor salivary glands; putamen; prefrontal cortex; caudate nucleus / Top expressed in: medial ganglionic eminence; stellate ganglion; thoracic ganglia; superior cervical ganglion; ventricular zone; trigeminal ganglion; embryo; neural tube; greater petrosal nerve; embryo; More reference expression data |
| BioGPS | n/a |
Gene ontology
| Molecular function | protein binding; metal ion binding; transferase activity; identical protein binding |
| Cellular component | ribonucleoprotein complex |
| Biological process | protein ubiquitination |
Sources:Amigo / QuickGO
Orthologs
| Databases | NCBI: entry; OMA: entry |
| Species | Human | Mouse |
| Entrez | 7681 | 22652 |
| Ensembl | ENSG00000179455 | ENSMUSG00000070527 |
| UniProt | Q13064; Q6NSB6 | Q60764 |
| RefSeq (mRNA) | NM_005664 | NM_011746 |
| RefSeq (protein) | NP_005655 | NP_035876 |
| Location (UCSC) | Chr 15: 23.57 – 23.63 Mb | Chr 7: 62.07 – 62.07 Mb |
| PubMed search |
- Wikidata
| View/Edit Human | View/Edit Mouse |

Makorin ring finger protein 3 is a protein that in humans is encoded by the MKRN3 gene.

== Function ==
The protein encoded by this gene contains a RING (C3HC4) zinc finger motif and several C3H zinc finger motifs. This gene is intronless and imprinted, with expression only from the paternal allele. Disruption of the imprinting at this locus may contribute to Prader–Willi syndrome. An antisense RNA of unknown function has been found overlapping this gene.
