= KRT37 =

Protein-coding gene in humans

Identifiers
- Aliases: KRT37, HA7, K37, KRTHA7, keratin 37
- External IDs: OMIM: 604541; GeneCards: KRT37

Gene location (Human)
Chr.	Chromosome 17 (human)
Band	17q21.2	Start	41,420,547 bp
Band	17q21.2	End	41,424,585 bp
RNA expression pattern
Bgee	Human / Mouse (ortholog); Top expressed in: gonad; skin of abdomen; skin of leg; canal of the cervix; ectocervix; smooth muscle tissue; vagina; wall of uterus; endometrium; right lung / n/a; More reference expression data
BioGPS	n/a
Gene ontology
Molecular function	structural molecule activity
Cellular component	intermediate filament; extracellular exosome; cytosol
Biological process	keratinization; cornification
Sources:Amigo / QuickGO
Orthologs
Databases	NCBI: entry; OMA: entry
Species	Human	Mouse
Entrez	8688	n/a
Ensembl	ENSG00000263022; ENSG00000108417	n/a
UniProt	O76014	n/a
RefSeq (mRNA)	NM_003770	n/a
RefSeq (protein)	NP_003761	n/a
Location (UCSC)	Chr 17: 41.42 – 41.42 Mb	n/a
PubMed search		n/a
- Wikidata
View/Edit Human

Keratin, type I cuticular Ha7 is a protein that in humans is encoded by the KRT37 gene. KRT37 is a member of the keratin gene family. The protein is a type I keratin and a hair keratin.

== Clinical significance ==
KRT37 is the only keratin that is regulated by androgens. This sensitivity to androgens was acquired by Homo sapiens and is not shared with their great ape cousins. Although Winter et al. found that KRT37 is expressed in all the hair follicles of chimpanzees, it was not detected in the head hair of modern humans. As androgens are known to grow hair on the body but decrease it on the scalp, this lack of scalp KRT37 may help explain the paradoxical nature of androgenic alopecia as well as the fact that head hair anagen cycles are extremely long. Moreover, variations in the gene may account for ethnic differences in body and facial hair.
