= PNMA2 =

Mammalian protein found in Homo sapiens

Identifiers
- Aliases: PNMA2, MA2, MM2, RGAG2, paraneoplastic Ma antigen 2, PNMA family member 2
- External IDs: OMIM: 603970; MGI: 2444129; GeneCards: PNMA2

Gene location (Human)
Chr.	Chromosome 8 (human)
Band	8p21.2	Start	26,504,701 bp
Band	8p21.2	End	26,514,092 bp

Gene location (Mouse)
Chr.	Chromosome 14 (mouse)
Band	14|14 D1	Start	67,148,619 bp
Band	14|14 D1	End	67,158,472 bp
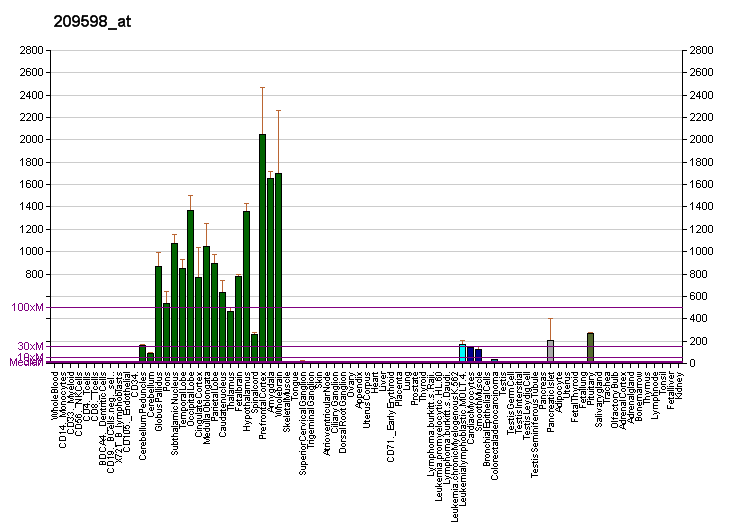

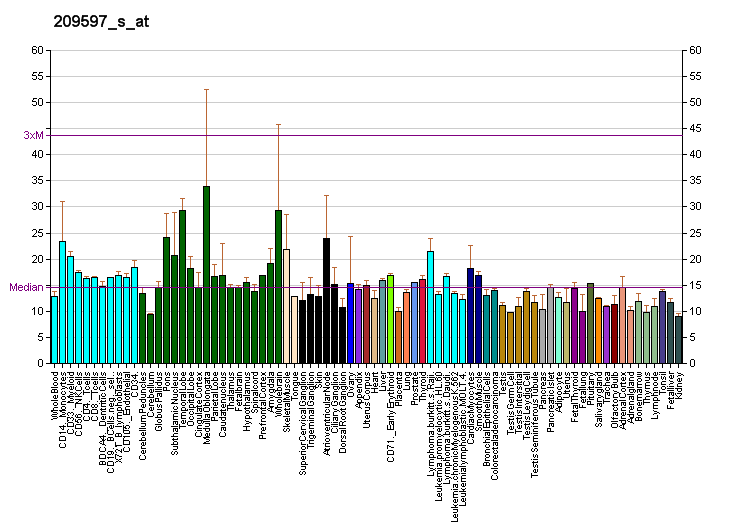
RNA expression pattern
Bgee	Human / Mouse (ortholog); Top expressed in: orbitofrontal cortex; middle temporal gyrus; postcentral gyrus; superior frontal gyrus; Brodmann area 46; Brodmann area 23; superior vestibular nucleus; lateral nuclear group of thalamus; pons; endothelial cell / Top expressed in: ventromedial nucleus; lumbar spinal ganglion; temporal lobe; amygdala; lateral septal nucleus; anterior amygdaloid area; lateral hypothalamus; facial motor nucleus; hippocampus proper; substantia nigra; More reference expression data
BioGPS	More reference expression data
Gene ontology
Molecular function	protein binding
Cellular component	nucleus; nucleolus
Biological process	positive regulation of apoptotic process
Sources:Amigo / QuickGO
Orthologs
Databases	NCBI: entry; OMA: entry
Species	Human	Mouse
Entrez	10687	239157
Ensembl	ENSG00000240694	ENSMUSG00000046204
UniProt	Q9UL42	Q8BHK0
RefSeq (mRNA)	NM_007257	NM_175498
RefSeq (protein)	NP_009188	NP_780707
Location (UCSC)	Chr 8: 26.5 – 26.51 Mb	Chr 14: 67.15 – 67.16 Mb
PubMed search
- Wikidata
View/Edit Human	View/Edit Mouse

Paraneoplastic antigen Ma2 (PNMA2), also known as Ma2 or MM2, is a protein that in humans is encoded by the PNMA2 gene on chromosome 8 (8p21.2). The gene encodes an approximately 40 kDa onconeuronal protein predominantly expressed in neurons of the central nervous system and belongs to the paraneoplastic Ma antigen (PNMA) protein family.

PNMA2 can self-assemble into virus-like particles which closely resemble the capsids of HIV-1. These capsids can act as an extracellular antigen and have been found to be capable of generating an autoimmune response. The conserved virus-like aspects of PNMA2 is shared with other retrotransposons-dertived mammalian proteins such as Arc and PEG10.

== Evolution ==
The PNMA2 gene is located on the short arm of human chromosome 8 in a cytogenetic band. It comprises three exons, the third of which encodes the entire open reading frame. Phylogenomic analysis suggests PNMA2 was co-opted from an LTR retrotransposon of the Ty3/mdg4 family in the common ancestor of placental mammals approximately 100 mya. It appears across all major placental mammal lineages except marsupials. The promoter region lies 150 base pairs from the neighboring DPYSL2 gene, with which it likely shares a bidirectional promoter, this may have facilitated the gene's co-option.

== Clinical significance ==
Normally sequestered within the immune-privileged CNS, PNMA2 can be ectopically expressed by certain peripheral tumors, leading to release of virus-like capsids into systemic circulation, and this can trigger an autoimmune response. The resulting autoantibodies preferentially target the epitopes of the capsid and cross-react with normal PNMA2 in the brain, causing what is known as "anti-Ma2 paraneoplastic neurological syndrome" (Ma2-PNS).

== See also ==
- MER41
- HEMO protein
