= Cholesin =

Mammalian protein found in Homo sapiens

CHLSN

Identifiers
- Aliases: CHLSN, YCR016W, chromosome 7 open reading frame 50, C7orf50, Cholesin, Uncharacterized Protein C7orf50
- External IDs: MGI: 1920462; GeneCards: CHLSN

Gene location (Human)
Chr.	Chromosome 7 (human)
Band	7p22.3	Start	996,986 bp
Band	7p22.3	End	1,138,260 bp

Gene location (Mouse)
Chr.	Chromosome 5 (mouse)
Band	5|5 G2	Start	139,345,494 bp
Band	5|5 G2	End	139,446,282 bp
RNA expression pattern
Bgee	Human / Mouse (ortholog); Top expressed in: anterior pituitary; right coronary artery; cingulate gyrus; anterior cingulate cortex; right frontal lobe; amygdala; sural nerve; apex of heart; popliteal artery; tibial arteries / Top expressed in: yolk sac; primitive streak; aortic valve; ascending aorta; otolith organ; utricle; epiblast; oocyte; primary oocyte; secondary oocyte; More reference expression data
BioGPS	n/a
Orthologs
Databases	NCBI: entry; OMA: entry
Species	Human	Mouse
Entrez	84310	73212
Ensembl	ENSG00000146540	ENSMUSG00000053553
UniProt	Q9BRJ6	Q9CXL3
RefSeq (mRNA)	NM_001134395; NM_001134396; NM_032350; NM_001318252; NM_001350968 NM_001350969; NM_001350970	NM_028469
RefSeq (protein)	NP_001127867; NP_001127868; NP_001305181; NP_115726; NP_001337897 NP_001337898; NP_001337899	NP_082745
Location (UCSC)	Chr 7: 1 – 1.14 Mb	Chr 5: 139.35 – 139.45 Mb
PubMed search
- Wikidata
View/Edit Human	View/Edit Mouse

Cholesin is a protein which in humans is encoded by the gene CHLSN. It functions as a hormone that regulates the synthesis of cholesterol, and the way it does it is distinctive in that it can be involved in either increasing or decreasing synthesis, rather than a simple one-way effect. This function appears to be occur through binding to its receptor GPR146.

It is most highly produced in the upper digestive system and respiratory system, in addition to the (hormone producing) endocrine system. Additionally, this gene is predicted to be a microRNA (miRNA) protein coding host gene, meaning that it may contain miRNA genes in its introns and/or exons.

== Gene ==
=== Location ===
CHLSN is located on the short arm of chromosome 7 (7p22.3), and spans 160,361 bps on the minus (-) strand and contains a total of 13 exons.

=== Gene Neighborhood ===
Genes within the neighborhood of CHLSN are the following: LOC105375120, GPR146, LOC114004405, LOC107986755, ZFAND2A, LOC102723758, LOC106799841, COX19, ADAP1, CYP2W1, MIR339, GPER1, and LOC101927021.

=== Other animals ===
Cholesin is conserved in chimpanzees, Rhesus monkeys, dogs, cows, mice, rats, and chickens, along with 307 other organisms from mammals to fungi.

== mRNA ==
=== Alternative Splicing ===
CHLSN has a total of 7 experimentally curated mRNA transcripts. The longest and most complete of these transcripts (transcript 4) being 2138bp, producing a 194 amino acid-long (aa) protein, and consisting of 5 exons. Of these transcripts, four of them encode for the same 194aa protein (isoform a), only differing in their 5' and 3' untranslated regions (UTRs). The three other transcripts encode isoform b, c, and d, respectively. The table below is representative of these transcripts.

CHLSN Experimentally Determined NCBI Reference Sequences (RefSeq) mRNA Transcripts
Name	NCBI Accession #	Transcript Length	# of Exons	Protein Length	Isoform
Transcript Variant 1	NM_032350.5	1311bp	5	194aa	a
Transcript Variant 2	NM_001134395.1	1301bp	5	194aa	a
Transcript Variant 3	NM_001134396.1	1282bp	5	194aa	a
Transcript Variant 4	NM_001318252.2	2138bp	5	194aa	a
Transcript Variant 7	NM_001350968.1	1081bp	6	193aa	b
Transcript Variant 8	NM_001350969.1	1500bp	5	180aa	c
Transcript Variant 9	NM_001350970.1	1448bp	3	60aa	d

Alternatively, when the primary genomic assembly, GRCh38.p13, is used for annotation (NCBI: NC_000007.14), there are 10 computationally predicted mRNA transcripts. The most complete and supported of these transcripts (transcript variant X6) is 1896bp, producing a 225aa-long protein. In total, there are 6 different isoforms predicted for CHLSN. Of these transcripts, 5 of them encode for the same isoform (X3). The remaining transcripts encode isoforms X2, X4, X5, X6, and X7 as represented below.

CHLSN Computationally Determined NCBI Reference Sequences (RefSeq) mRNA Transcripts
Name	NCBI Accession #	Transcript Length	Protein Length	Isoform
Transcript Variant X2	XM_017012719.1	1447bp	375aa	X2
Transcript Variant X3	XM_011515582.3	1192bp	225aa	X3
Transcript Variant X4	XM_024446977.1	1057bp	193aa	X4
Transcript Variant X5	XM_011515581.3	1240bp	225aa	X3
Transcript Variant X6	XM_011515584.2	1896bp	225aa	X3
Transcript Variant X7	XM_017012720.2	1199bp	225aa	X3
Transcript Variant X8	XM_011515583.2	1215bp	225aa	X3
Transcript Variant X9	XM_017012721.2	2121bp	211aa	X5
Transcript Variant X10	XM_024446978.1	2207bp	180aa	X6
Transcript Variant X11	XM_024446979.1	933bp	93aa	X7

=== 5' and 3' UTR ===
Based on the experimentally determined CHLSN mRNA transcript variant 4, the 5' UTR of CHLSN is 934 nucleotides (nt) long, while the 3' UTR is 619nt. The coding sequence (CDS) of this transcript spans nt 935..1519 for a total length of 584nt and is encoded in reading frame 2.

== Protein ==
=== General Properties ===
The CHLSN Isoform a's 194aa protein sequence from NCBI is as follows:

>NP_001127867.1 cholesin isoform a [Homo sapiens]
MAKQKRKVPEVTEKKNKKLKKASAEGPLLGPEAAPSGEGAGSKGEAVLRPGLDAEPELSPEEQRVLERKL 70
KKERKKEERQRLREAGLVAQHPPARRSGAELALDYLCRWAQKHKNWRFQKTRQTWLLLHMYDSDKVPDEH 140
FSTLLAYLEGLQGRARELTVQKAEALMRELDEEGSDPPLPGRAQRIRQVLQLLS                 194

The underlined region within the sequence is indicative of a domain known as DUF2373 ("domain of unknown function 2373"), found in isoforms a, b, and c.

Cholesin has a predicted molecular weight (Mw) of 22 kDa, making cholesin smaller than the average protein (52 kDa). The isoelectric point (theoretical pI) for this isoform is 9.7, meaning that cholesin is slightly basic. As for charge runs and patterns within isoform a, there is a significant mixed charge (*) run (-++0++-+++--+) from aa67 to aa79 and an acidic (-) run from aa171 – aa173. It is likely that this mixed charge run encodes the protein-protein interaction (PPI) site of cholesin.

Characterization of the protein has shown binding to GPR146. Based on a proposed role in regulation of serum cholesterol levels in response to dietary cholesterol intake, the protein has been called cholesin.

=== Domains and Motifs ===
DUF2373 is a domain of unknown function found in the cholesin. This is a highly conserved c-terminal region found from fungi to humans. As for motifs, a bipartite nuclear localization signal (NLS) was predicted from aa6 to aa21, meaning that cholesin is likely localized in the nucleus. Interestingly, a nuclear export signal (NES) is also found within cholesin at the following amino acids: 150, and 153 - 155, suggesting that cholesin has function both inside and outside the nucleus.

Schematic Model of cholesin. Green region is indicative of nuclear localization signal (NLS), blue of the mixed charge run, and orange of the DUF2373. Marked sites are indicative of post-translational modifications. Image made with Prosite MyDomains tool.

=== Structure ===
==== Secondary Structure ====
The majority of cholesin (isoform a) secondary structure is made up of alpha helices, with the remainder being small portions of random coils, beta turns, or extended strands.

==== Tertiary Structure ====
The tertiary structure of cholesin consists primarily of alpha helices as determined I-TASSER.

==== Quaternary Structure ====
The interaction network (quaternary structure) involving the cholesin has significantly more (p < 1.0e-16) interactions than a randomly selected set of proteins.

Functional Enrichments within the CHLSN Network
Biological Processes	rRNA processing	maturation of 5.8S, LSU, and SSU rRNA
Molecular Functions	catalytic activity, acting on RNA	ATP-dependent RNA helicase activity
Cellular Components	nucleolus	preribosomes
Reactome Pathways	major pathway of rRNA processing in the nucleolus and cytosol	rRNA modification in the nucleus and cytosol
Protein Domains and Motifs	helicase conserved C-terminal domain	DEAD/DEAH box helicase

The closest predicted functional partners of cholesin are the following proteins: DDX24, DDX52, PES1, EBNA1BP2, RSLD1, NOP14, FTSJ3, KRR1, LYAR, and PWP1. These proteins are predicted to co-express rather than bind directly to cholesin and each other.

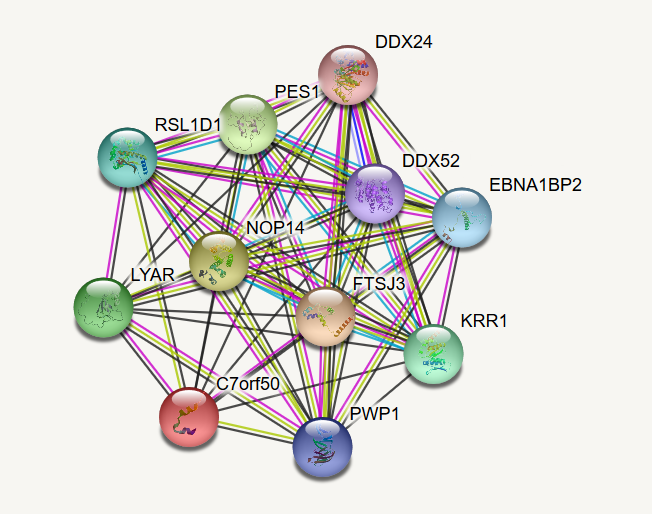
STRING quaternary analysis of C7orf50. Shows protein-protein interactions (direct and indirect) associated with C7orf50. Network nodes (circles) represent proteins. Edges (lines) represent protein-protein associations.

== Regulation ==
=== Gene Regulation ===
==== Promoter ====
CHLSN has 6 predicted promoter regions. The promoter with the greatest number of transcripts and CAGE tags overall is promoter set 6 (GXP_6755694) on ElDorado by Genomatix. This promoter region is on the minus (-) strand and has a start position of 1,137,965 and an end position of 1,139,325, making this promoter 1,361bp long. It has 16 coding transcripts and the transcript with the greatest identity to C7orf50 transcript 4 is transcript GXT_27788039 with 98746 CAGE tags.

Promoter ID	Start Position	End Position	Length	# of Coding Transcripts	Greatest # of CAGE Tags in Transcripts
GXP_9000582	1013063	1013163	1101bp	0	N/A
GXP_6755691	1028239	1030070	1832bp	4	169233
GXP_6053282	1055206	1056306	1101bp	1	449
GXP_3207505	1127288	1128388	1101bp	1	545
GXP_9000584	1130541	1131641	1101bp	0	N/A
GXP_6755694	1137965	1139325	1361bp	16	100,070

The CpG island associated with this promoter has 75 CpGs (22% of island), and is 676bp long. The C count plus G count is 471, the percentage C or G is 70% within this island, and the ratio of observed to expected CpG is 0.91.

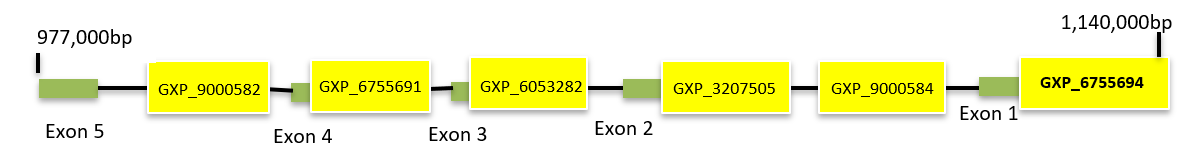
C7orf50 with ElDorado suggested promoters with exons labeled. Gene is on the minus (-) strand, thus promoter (GXP_6755694) transcripts runs 5' to 3' on the bottom strand (R to L).

==== Transcription Factor Binding Sites ====
As determined by MatInspector at Genomatix, the following transcription factor (TFs) families are most highly predicted to bind to CHLSN in the promoter region.

Transcription Factor	Detailed Family Information
NR2F	Nuclear receptor subfamily 2 factors
PERO	Peroxisome proliferator-activated receptor
HOMF	Homeodomain transcription factors
PRDM	PR (PRDI-BF1-RIZ1 homologous) domain transcription factor
VTBP	Vertebrate TATA binding protein factor
HZIP	Homeodomain-leucine zipper transcription factors
ZTRE	Zinc transcriptional regulatory element
XBBF	X-box binding factors
SP1F	GC-Box factors SP1/GC
CAAT	CCAAT binding factors
ZF57	KRAB domain zinc finger protein 57
CTCF	CTCF and BORIS gene family, transcriptional regulators with highly conserved zinc finger domains
MYOD	Myoblast determining factors
KLFS	Krueppel like transcription factors

==== Expression Pattern ====
CHLSN shows ubiquitous expression in the kidneys, brain, fat, prostate, spleen and 22 other tissues and low tissue and immune cell specificity . This expression is very high, 4 times above the average gene; therefore, there is a higher abundance of CHLSN mRNA than the average gene within a cell. There does not appear to be a definitive cell type in which this gene is not expressed.

=== Transcription Regulation ===
==== Splice Enhancers ====
The mRNA of CHLSN is predicted to have exonic splicing enhancers, in which SR proteins can bind, at bp positions 45 (SRSF1 (IgM-BRCA1)), 246 (SRSF6), 703 (SRSF5), 1301 (SRSF1), and 1308 (SRSF2)

==== miRNA Targeting ====
There are many poorly conserved miRNA binding sites predicted within the 3'UTR of CHLSN mRNA. The notable miRNA families that are predicted to bind to CHLSN mRNA and regulate/repress transcription are the following: miR-138-5p, miR-18-5p, miR-129-3p, miR-124-3p.1, miR-10-5p, and miR-338-3p.

=== Protein Regulation ===
==== Subcellular Localization ====
Cholesin is predicted to localize intercellularly in both the nucleus and cytoplasm, but primarily within the nucleoplasm and nucleoli.

==== Post-Translational Modification ====
Cholesin is predicted to be mucin-type GalNAc o-glycosylated at the following amino acid sites: 12, 23, 36, 42, 59, and 97. Additionally, this protein is predicted to be SUMOylated at aa71 with the SUMO protein binding from aa189 through aa193. Cholesin is also predicted to be kinase-specific phosphorylated at the following amino acids: 12, 23, 36, 42, 59, 97, 124, 133, 159, and 175. Interestingly, many of these sites overlap with the o-glycosylation sites. Of these phosphorylation sites, the majority are serines (53%) with the remainder being either tyrosines or threonines. The most associated kinases with these sites are the following kinase groups: AGC, CAMK, TKL, and STE. Finally, this protein is predicted to have 8 glycations of the ε amino groups of lysines at the following sites: aa3, 5, 14, 15, 17, 21, 76, and 120.

== Homology ==
=== Paralogs ===
No paralogs of cholesin have been detected in the human genome; however, there is slight evidence (58% similarity) of a paralogous DUF2373 domain in the protein of KIDINS220.

=== Orthologs ===
Below is a table of a variety of orthologs of the human CHLSN. The table includes closely, moderately, and distantly related orthologs. CHLSN is highly evolutionary conserved from mammals to fungi. When these ortholog sequences are compared, the most conserved portions are those of DUF2373. CHLSN has evolved moderately and evenly over time with a divergence rate greater than Hemoglobin but less than Cytochrome C.

Selected Orthologs of CHLSN
Genus and species	Common name	Taxon Class	Date of Divergence (MYA)	Accession #	Length (AA)	% identity w/ human
Homo sapiens	Human	Mammalia	N/A	NM_001318252.2	194aa	100%
Tupaia chinensis	Chinese Tree Shrew	Mammalia	82	XP_006167949.1	194aa	76%
Dasypus novemcinctus	Nine-banded Armadillo	Mammalia	105	XP_004483895.1	198aa	70%
Miniopterus natalens	Natal Long-fingered Bat	Mammalia	96	XP_016068464.1	199aa	69%
Protobothrops mucrosquamatus	Brown-spotted Pit Viper	Reptilia	312	XP_015673296.1	196aa	64%
Balearica regulorum gibbericeps	Grey-crowned Crane	Aves	312	XP_010302837.1	194aa	61%
Falco peregrinus	Peregrine Falcon	Aves	312	XP_027635198.1	193aa	59%
Xenopus laevis	African Clawed Frog	Amphibia	352	XP_018094637.1	198aa	50%
Electrophorus electricus	Electric Eel	Actinopterygii	435	XP_026880604.1	195aa	53%
Rhincodon typus	Whale Shark	Chondrichthyes	465	XP_020372968.1	195aa	52%
Ciona intestinalis	Sea Vase	Ascidiacea	676	XP_026696561.1	282aa	37%
Octopus bimaculoides	California Two-spot Octopus	Cephalopoda	797	XP_014772175.1	221aa	40%
Priapulus caudatus	Priapulus	Priapulida	797	XP_014663190.1	333aa	39%
Bombus terrestris	Buff-tailed Bumblebee	Insecta	797	XP_012171653.1	260aa	32%
Actinia tenebrosa	Australian Red Waratah Sea Anemone	Anthozoa	824	XP_031575029.1	330aa	43%
Trichoplax adhaerens	Trichoplax	Trichoplacidae	948	XP_002110193.1	137aa	44%
Spizellomyces punctatus	Branching Chytrid Fungi	Fungi	1105	XP_016610491.1	412aa	29%
Eremothecium cymbalariae	Fungi	Fungi	1105	XP_003644395.1	266aa	25%
Quercus suber	Cork Oak Tree	Plantae	1496	XP_023896156.1	508aa	30%
Plasmopara halstedii	Downy Mildew of Sunflower	Oomycetes	1768	XP_024580369.1	179aa	26%

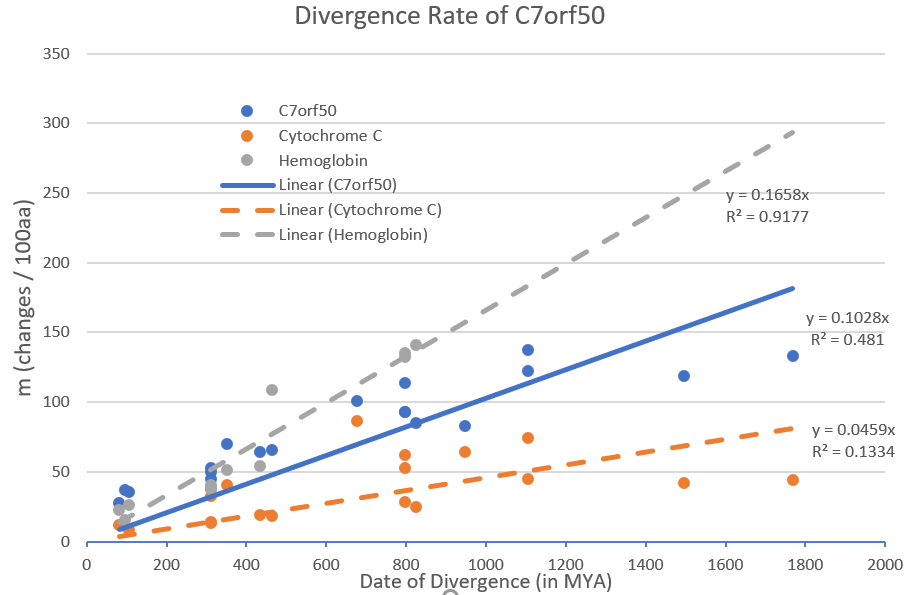
Rate of CHLSN divergence compared to divergence rates of Hemoglobin and Cytochrome C.

=== Interacting Proteins ===
Proteins Predicted to Interact with cholesin
Name of Protein	Name of Gene	Function	UniProt Accession #
THAP1 domain-containing protein 1	THAP1	DNA-binding transcription regulator that regulates endothelial cell proliferation and G1/S cell-cycle progression.	Q9NVV9
Protein Tax-2	tax	Transcriptional activator that activates both the viral long terminal repeat (LTR) and cellular promoters via activation of CREB, NF-kappa-B, SRF and AP-1 pathways.	P03410
Major Prion Protein	PRNP	Its primary physiological function is unclear. May play a role in neuronal development and synaptic plasticity. May be required for neuronal myelin sheath maintenance. May promote myelin homeostasis through acting as an agonist for ADGRG6 receptor. May play a role in iron uptake and iron homeostasis.	P04156
Aldehyde dehydrogenase X, mitochondrial	ALDH1B1	Pay a major role in the detoxification of alcohol-derived acetaldehyde. They are involved in the metabolism of corticosteroids, biogenic amines, neurotransmitters, and lipid peroxidation.	P30837
Cell growth-regulating nucleolar protein	LYAR	Plays a role in the maintenance of the appropriate processing of 47S/45S pre-rRNA to 32S/30S pre-rRNAs and their subsequent processing to produce 18S and 28S rRNAs.	Q9NX58
Coiled-coil domain-containing protein 85B	CCDC85B	Functions as a transcriptional repressor.	Q15834
Nucleolar protein 56	NOP56	Involved in the early to middle stages of 60S ribosomal subunit biogenesis. Core component of box C/D small nucleolar ribonucleoprotein (snoRNP) particles. Required for the biogenesis of box C/D snoRNAs such U3, U8 and U14 snoRNAs.	O00567
rRNA 2'-O-methyltransferase fibrillarin	FBL	Has the ability to methylate both RNAs and proteins. Involved in pre-rRNA processing by catalyzing the site-specific 2'-hydroxyl methylation of ribose moieties in pre-ribosomal RNA.	P22087
40S ribosomal protein S6	RPS6	May play an important role in controlling cell growth and proliferation through the selective translation of particular classes of mRNA.	P62753

=== Clinical Significance ===
CHLSN has been noted in a variety of genome-wide association studies (GWAS) and has been shown to be associated with type 2 diabetes among sub-Saharan Africans, daytime sleepiness in African-Americans, prenatal exposure to particulate matter, heritable DNA methylation marks associated with breast cancer, DNA methylation in relation to plasma carotenoids and lipid profile, and has significant interactions with prion proteins.
