= FTSJ =

FTSJ may refer to:

- 23S rRNA (uridine2552-2'-O)-methyltransferase, an enzyme
- FTSJ1, an enzyme
- FTSJ3, an enzyme
