= KRR =

KRR may refer to:

- FK Jūrnieks, a Latvian football club, known as KRR from 1964 to 1968
- Kallio Rolling Rainbow, a Finnish roller derby league
- Kiamichi Railroad, reporting mark
- Kirkintilloch Rob Roy, a Scottish football club in the West of Scotland Football League
- Krasnodar International Airport, North Caucasus, Russia, IATA Code
- Kommissarische Reichsregierung, a German political movement
- K. R. Ramasamy (actor) (1914–1971), Indian actor and singer in Tamil cinema
- Knowledge representation and reasoning in artificial intelligence
- KR Reykjavík, an association football club in Iceland.

== See also ==
- KRR1, a protein
