= GPR146 =

Protein-coding gene in the species Homo sapiens

Identifiers
- Aliases: GPR146, PGR8, G protein-coupled receptor 146
- External IDs: MGI: 1933113; GeneCards: GPR146

Gene location (Human)
Chr.	Chromosome 7 (human)
Band	7p22.3	Start	1,044,546 bp
Band	7p22.3	End	1,059,261 bp

Gene location (Mouse)
Chr.	Chromosome 5 (mouse)
Band	5|5 G2	Start	139,377,697 bp
Band	5|5 G2	End	139,396,415 bp
RNA expression pattern
Bgee	Human / Mouse (ortholog); Top expressed in: subcutaneous adipose tissue; abdominal fat; apex of heart; gastric mucosa; right lung; tibial nerve; blood; left ventricle; body of stomach; upper lobe of left lung / Top expressed in: interventricular septum; retinal pigment epithelium; muscle of thigh; myocardium of ventricle; left lobe of liver; right lung; triceps brachii muscle; right kidney; right lung lobe; stroma of bone marrow; More reference expression data
BioGPS	n/a
Gene ontology
Molecular function	signal transducer activity; G protein-coupled receptor activity
Cellular component	plasma membrane; membrane; integral component of membrane
Biological process	G protein-coupled receptor signaling pathway; signal transduction
Sources:Amigo / QuickGO
Orthologs
Databases	NCBI: entry; OMA: entry
Species	Human	Mouse
Entrez	115330	80290
Ensembl	ENSG00000164849	ENSMUSG00000044197
UniProt	Q96CH1	Q99LE2
RefSeq (mRNA)	NM_001303473; NM_001303474; NM_138445	NM_001038703; NM_030258
RefSeq (protein)	NP_001290402; NP_001290403; NP_612454	NP_001033792; NP_084534; NP_001349135
Location (UCSC)	Chr 7: 1.04 – 1.06 Mb	Chr 5: 139.38 – 139.4 Mb
PubMed search
- Wikidata
View/Edit Human	View/Edit Mouse

G-protein coupled receptor 146 is a protein that in humans is encoded by the GPR146 gene. The receptor has been shown to bind cholesin, a gut-derived hormone that is secreted from the intestine in response to dietary cholesterol absorption. In response to cholesin binding, GPR146 signaling inhibit cholesterol synthesis. Consistent with this interaction, murine genetic disruption of GPR146 lowers serum cholesterol and reduces atherosclerotic aortic lesions. GPR146 has also been identified as a possible receptor for C-peptide.
