= Oncogene =

Gene that has the potential to cause cancer

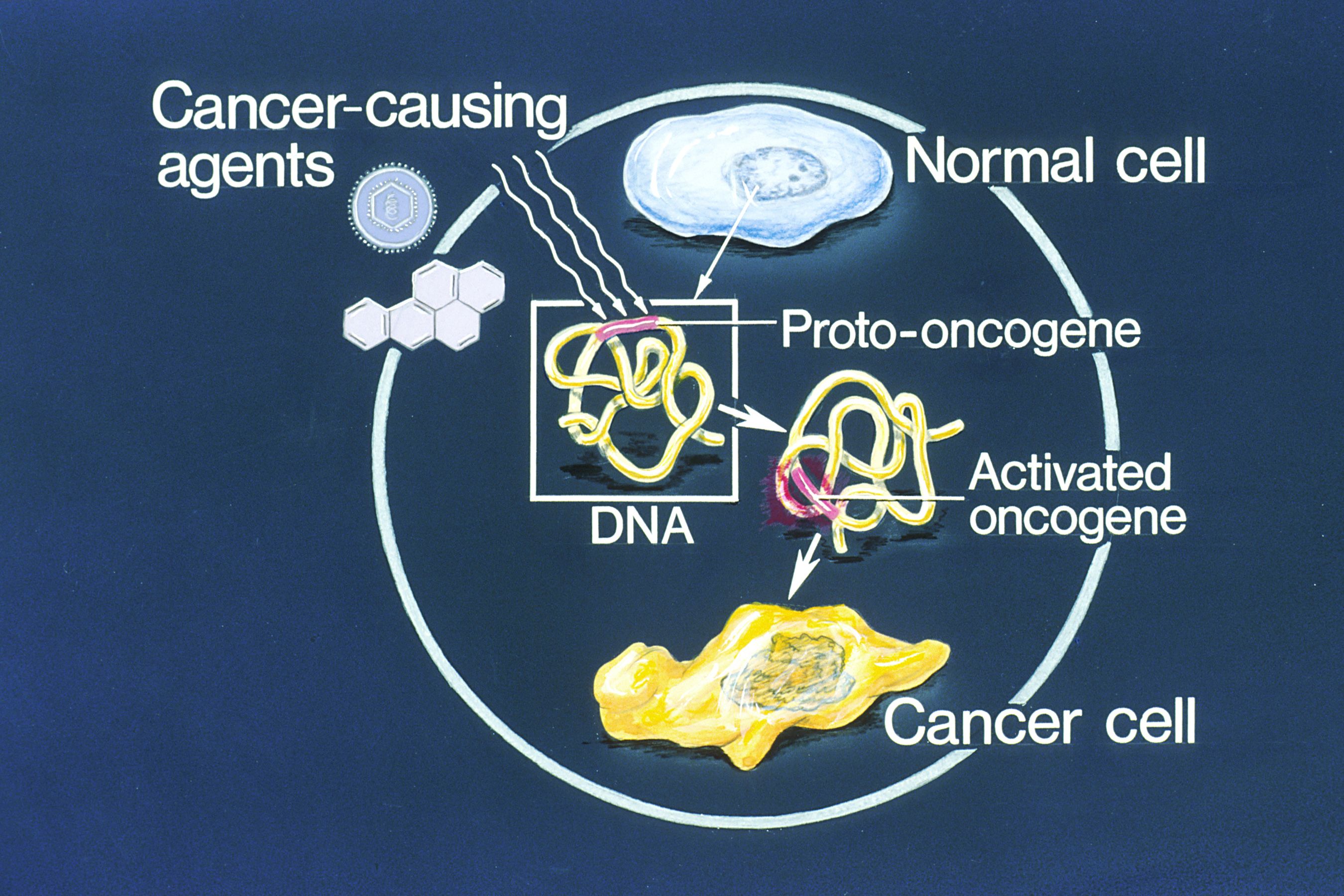
Illustration of how a normal cell is converted to a cancer cell, when an oncogene becomes activated

An oncogene is a gene that has the potential to cause cancer. In tumor cells, these genes are often mutated, or expressed at high levels.

Most normal cells undergo a preprogrammed rapid cell death (apoptosis) if critical functions are altered and then malfunction. Activated oncogenes can cause those cells designated for apoptosis to survive and proliferate instead. Most oncogenes began as proto-oncogenes, normal genes involved in cell growth and proliferation or inhibition of apoptosis. If, through mutation, normal genes promoting cellular growth are up-regulated (gain-of-function mutation), they predispose the cell to cancer and are termed oncogenes. Usually, multiple oncogenes, along with mutated apoptotic or tumor suppressor genes, act in concert to cause cancer. Oncogenes are a physically and functionally diverse set of genes, and as a result, their protein products have pleiotropic effects on a variety of intricate regulatory cascades within the cell.

Since the 1970s, dozens of oncogenes have been identified in human cancer. Many cancer drugs target the proteins encoded by oncogenes. The resultant protein encoded by an oncogene is termed oncoprotein. Oncogenes play an important role in the regulation or synthesis of proteins linked to tumorigenic cell growth. Some oncoproteins are accepted and used as tumor markers.

== Overview ==
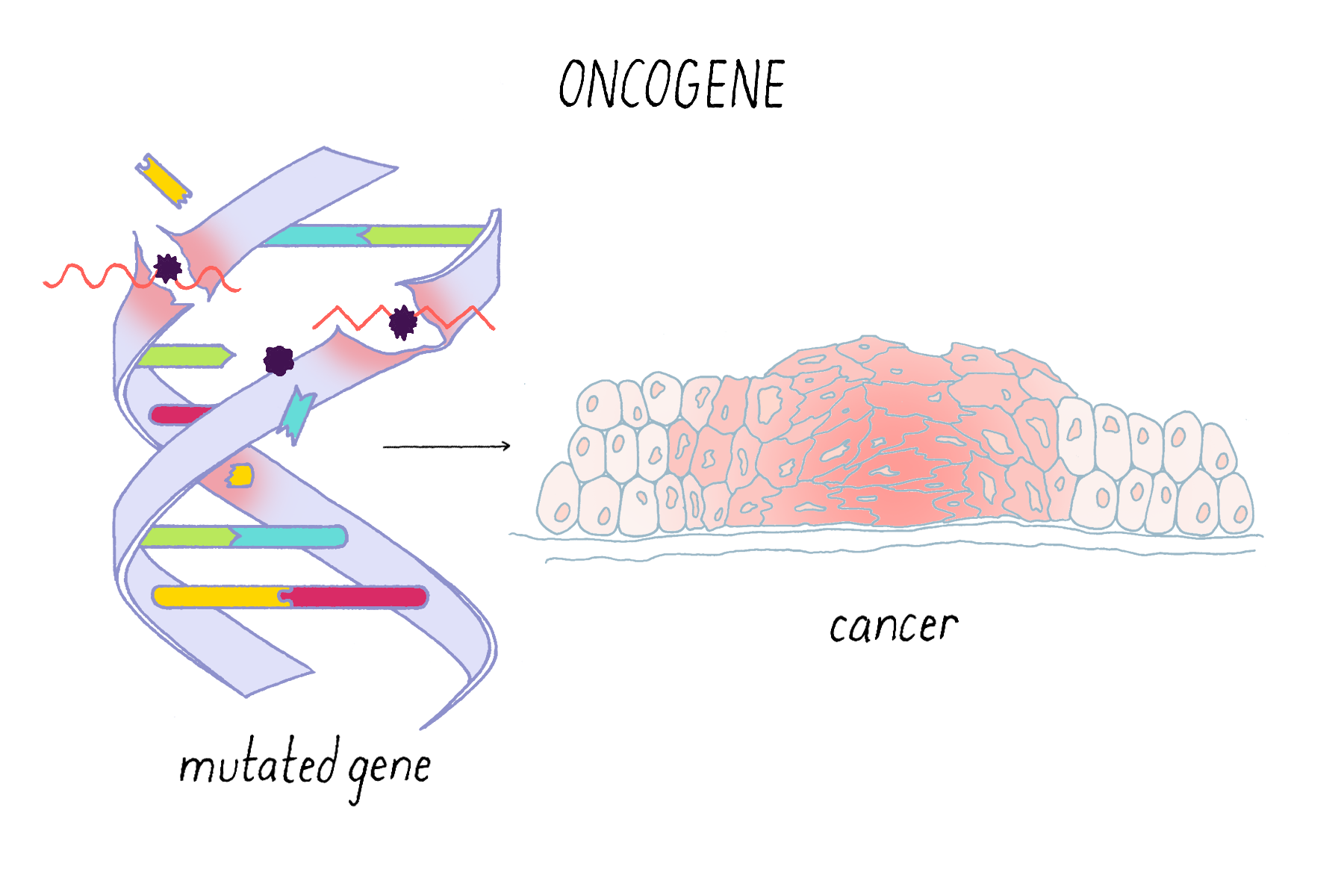
Any gene that when mutated can contribute to the formation of cancer.

Genes known as proto-oncogenes are those that normally encourage cell growth and division in order to generate new cells or sustain the viability of pre-existing cells. When overexpressed, proto-oncogenes can be inadvertently activated (turned on), which changes them to oncogenes.

There are numerous ways to activate (turn on) oncogenes in cells:

Gene changes or mutations
A person's genetic "coding" may differ in a way that causes an oncogene to always be activated. These types of gene changes can develop spontaneously throughout the course of a person's life or they might be inherited from a parent when a transcription error occurs during cell division.
Epigenetics
Cells can frequently switch genes on or off via epigenetic mechanisms rather than actual genetic alterations. Alternately, different chemical compounds that can be linked to genetic material (DNA or RNA) may have an impact on which genes are active. An oncogene may sporadically become activated due to these epigenetic modifications.
Chromosomal rearrangement
Every living creature has chromosomes, which are substantial strands of DNA that contain the genes for a cell. A chromosome's DNA sequence may alter each time a cell divides. This could cause a gene to be located near to a proto-oncogene that acts as an "on" switch, keeping it active even when it shouldn't. The cell can develop irregularly with the aid of this new oncogene.
Gene duplication
If one cell has more copies of a gene than another, that cell may produce too much of a certain protein.

The first human oncogene (HRAS), a crucial finding in the field of cancer research, was discovered in the early 1980s, and since then, the number of novel pathogenic oncogenes identified has increased steadily. The discovery of specific small-molecule inhibitors that specifically target the different oncogenic proteins and a comprehensive mechanistic analysis of the ways in which oncogenes dysregulate physiological signaling to cause different cancer types and developmental syndromes are potential future advances in the field of cancer research. Investigating the quickly expanding field of oncogene molecular research, the goal of this special issue was to generate practical translational indicators that could be able to meet clinical needs.

Genes that are considered crucial for cancer can be divided into two categories based on whether the harmful mutations in them result in function loss or gain. Gain-of-function mutations of proto-oncogenes drive cells to proliferate when they shouldn't, while loss-of-function mutations of tumor suppressor genes free cells from inhibitions that typically serve to control their numbers. The ability of the mutant genes, known as oncogenes, to steer a specific line of test cells toward malignant proliferation can occasionally be used to identify these later mutations, which have a dominating effect.

Many of them were initially found to induce cancer in animals when they are introduced through viral infection, which carries an activated version of a proto-oncogene from a prior host cell (an oncovirus). Another method for identifying oncogenes is to look for genes that are activated by mutations in human cancer cells or by chromosomal translocations that may indicate the presence of a gene that is crucial for cancer.

== History ==
The theory of oncogenes was foreshadowed by the German biologist Theodor Boveri in his 1914 book Zur Frage der Entstehung Maligner Tumoren (Concerning the Origin of Malignant Tumors) in which he predicted the existence of oncogenes (Teilungsfoerdernde Chromosomen) that become amplified (im permanenten Übergewicht) during tumor development.

Later on, the term "oncogene" was rediscovered in 1969 by National Cancer Institute scientists George Todaro and Robert Huebner.

The first confirmed oncogene was discovered in 1970 and was termed SRC (pronounced "sarc" as it is short for sarcoma). SRC was first discovered as an oncogene in a chicken retrovirus. Experiments performed by Dr. G. Steve Martin of the University of California, Berkeley demonstrated that SRC was indeed the gene of the virus that acted as an oncogene upon infection. The first nucleotide sequence of v-Src was sequenced in 1980 by A.P. Czernilofsky et al.

In 1976, Drs. Dominique Stéhelin, J. Michael Bishop and Harold E. Varmus of the University of California, San Francisco demonstrated that oncogenes were activated proto-oncogenes as is found in many organisms, including humans. Bishop and Varmus were awarded the Nobel Prize in Physiology or Medicine in 1989 for their discovery of the cellular origin of retroviral oncogenes.

Dr. Robert Weinberg is credited with discovering the first identified human oncogene in a human bladder cancer cell line. The molecular nature of the mutation leading to oncogenesis was subsequently isolated and characterized by the Spanish biochemist Mariano Barbacid and published in Nature in 1982. Dr. Barbacid spent the following months extending his research, eventually discovering that the oncogene was a mutated allele of HRAS and characterizing its activation mechanism.

== Proto-oncogene ==
A proto-oncogene is a normal gene that could become an oncogene due to mutations or increased expression. Proto-oncogenes code for proteins that help to regulate the cell growth and differentiation. Proto-oncogenes are often involved in signal transduction and execution of mitogenic signals, usually through their protein products. Upon acquiring an activating mutation, a proto-oncogene becomes a tumor-inducing agent, an oncogene. Examples of proto-oncogenes include RAS, WNT, MYC, ERK, and TRK. The MYC gene is implicated in Burkitt's lymphoma, which starts when a chromosomal translocation moves an enhancer sequence within the vicinity of the MYC gene. The MYC gene codes for widely used transcription factors. When the enhancer sequence is wrongly placed, these transcription factors are produced at much higher rates. Another example of an oncogene is the Bcr-Abl gene found on the Philadelphia chromosome, a piece of genetic material seen in Chronic Myelogenous Leukemia caused by the translocation of pieces from chromosomes 9 and 22. Bcr-Abl codes for a tyrosine kinase, which is constitutively active, leading to uncontrolled cell proliferation. (More information about the Philadelphia Chromosome below)

=== Activation ===
From proto-oncogene to oncogene

The proto-oncogene can become an oncogene by a relatively small modification of its original function. There are three basic methods of activation:

1. A mutation within a proto-oncogene can cause a change in the protein structure, causing
  - an increase in protein activity
2. An increase in the amount of a certain protein (protein concentration), caused by
  - an increase of gene expression through mutations in the promoter region
  - an increase of protein stability, prolonging its existence and thus its activity in the cell
  - gene duplication (one type of chromosome abnormality)
3. A chromosomal translocation (another type of chromosome abnormality)
  - There are 2 different types of chromosomal translocations that can occur:
  1. translocation events which relocate a proto-oncogene to a new chromosomal site that leads to higher expression
  2. translocation events that lead to a fusion between a proto-oncogene and another gene which creates a fusion protein with increased cancerous/oncogenic activity
    - the expression of a constitutively active hybrid protein. This type of mutation in a dividing stem cell in the bone marrow leads to adult leukemia
    - Philadelphia Chromosome is an example of this type of translocation event. This chromosome was discovered in 1960 by Peter Nowell and David Hungerford, and it is a fusion of parts of DNA from chromosome 22 and chromosome 9. The broken end of chromosome 22 contains the "BCR" gene, which fuses with a fragment of chromosome 9 that contains the "ABL1" gene. When these two chromosome fragments fuse the genes also fuse creating a new gene: "BCR-ABL". This fused gene encodes for a protein that displays high protein tyrosine kinase activity (this activity is due to the "ABL1" half of the protein). The unregulated expression of this protein activates other proteins that are involved in cell cycle and cell division which can cause a cell to grow and divide uncontrollably (the cell becomes cancerous). As a result, the Philadelphia Chromosome is associated with Chronic Myelogenous Leukemia (as mentioned before) as well as other forms of Leukemia.

The expression of oncogenes can be regulated by microRNAs (miRNAs), small RNAs 21-25 nucleotides in length that control gene expression by downregulating them. Mutations in such microRNAs (known as oncomirs) can lead to activation of oncogenes. Antisense messenger RNAs could theoretically be used to block the effects of oncogenes.

== Classification ==
There are several systems for classifying oncogenes, but there is not yet a widely accepted standard. They are sometimes grouped both spatially (moving from outside the cell inwards) and chronologically (parallelling the "normal" process of signal transduction). There are several categories that are commonly used:

Category	Examples	Cancers	Gene functions
Growth factors, or mitogens	c-Sis	glioblastomas, fibrosarcomas, osteosarcomas, breast carcinomas, and melanomas	induces cell proliferation.
Receptor tyrosine kinases	epidermal growth factor receptor (EGFR), platelet-derived growth factor receptor (PDGFR), and vascular endothelial growth factor receptor (VEGFR), HER2/neu	Breast cancer, gastrointestinal stromal tumours, non-small-cell lung cancer and pancreatic cancer	transduce signals for cell growth and differentiation.
Cytoplasmic tyrosine kinases	Src-family, Syk-ZAP-70 family, and BTK family of tyrosine kinases, the Abl gene in CML - Philadelphia chromosome	colorectal and breast cancers, melanomas, ovarian cancers, gastric cancers, head and neck cancers, pancreatic cancer, lung cancer, brain cancers, and blood cancers	mediate the responses to, and the activation receptors of cell proliferation, migration, differentiation, and survival
Cytoplasmic Serine/threonine kinases and their regulatory subunits	Raf kinase, and cyclin-dependent kinases (through overexpression).	melanoma, papillary thyroid cancer, colorectal cancer, and ovarian cancer	involved in organism development, cell cycle regulation, cell proliferation, differentiation, cells survival, and apoptosis
Regulatory GTPases	Ras protein	adenocarcinomas of the pancreas and colon, thyroid tumors, and myeloid leukemia	involved in signalling a major pathway leading to cell proliferation.
Transcription factors	myc gene	malignant T-cell lymphomas and acute myeloid leukemias, breast cancer, pancreatic cancer, retinoblastoma, and small cell lung cancer	regulate transcription of genes that induce cell proliferation.
Transcriptional coactivators	YAP, WWTR1 genes	glioma, melanoma, lung cancer, breast cancers, and more	interact with transcription factor partners to regulate transcription of genes that induce cell proliferation.

Additional oncogenetic regulator properties include:

- Growth factors are usually secreted by either specialized or non-specialized cells to induce cell proliferation in themselves, nearby cells, or distant cells. An oncogene may cause a cell to secrete growth factors even though it does not normally do so. It will thereby induce its own uncontrolled proliferation (autocrine loop), and proliferation of neighboring cells, possibly leading to tumor formation. It may also cause production of growth hormones in other parts of the body.
- Receptor tyrosine kinases add phosphate groups to other proteins in order to turn them on or off. Receptor kinases add phosphate groups to receptor proteins at the surface of the cell (which receives protein signals from outside the cell and transmits them to the inside of the cell). Tyrosine kinases add phosphate groups to the amino acid tyrosine in the target protein. They can cause cancer by turning the receptor permanently on (constitutively), even without signals from outside the cell.
- Ras is a small GTPase that hydrolyses GTP into GDP and phosphate. Ras is activated by growth factor signaling (i.e., EGF, TGFbeta) and acting as a binary switch (on/off) in growth signaling pathways. Downstream effectors of Ras include three mitogen-activated protein kinases Raf a MAP Kinase Kinase Kinase (MAPKKK), MEK a MAP Kinase Kinase (MAPKK), and ERK a MAP Kinase(MAPK), which in turn regulate genes that mediate cell proliferation.

== Applications ==
=== Cancer classification ===
Cancer patients are generally categorized according to clinical parameters in order to tailor their cancer therapy. For example, the separation of patients with acute leukemia into those with lymphocytic leukemia and those with myelocytic leukemia is important, because the optimal treatment for each form is different. Even in a particular disease, the identification of patients with good and poor prognostic potential is helpful, since more aggressive therapy may be needed to achieve a cure in the poor prognostic group. Oncogenes are prognostic markers in certain human cancers. N-myc amplification is an independent determinant in predicting a poor outcome in childhood neuroblastoma. Those children with amplification of N-myc, regardless of stage, will have shortened survival. Thus, therapeutic efforts are concentrated on intensifying treatment in this poor prognostic group.

== See also ==
- Anticancer gene
- Oncogenomics
- Tumor suppressor gene
- Oncovirus
- Genetic predisposition
- Quantitative trait locus
- Genetic susceptibility
- Oncometabolism
