= FGF3 =

Protein-coding gene in humans

Identifiers
- Aliases: FGF3, HBGF-3, INT2, fibroblast growth factor 3
- External IDs: OMIM: 164950; MGI: 95517; GeneCards: FGF3

Gene location (Human)
Chr.	Chromosome 11 (human)
Band	11q13.3	Start	69,809,968 bp
Band	11q13.3	End	69,819,416 bp

Gene location (Mouse)
Chr.	Chromosome 7 (mouse)
Band	7 F5|7 88.85 cM	Start	144,391,820 bp
Band	7 F5|7 88.85 cM	End	144,398,173 bp
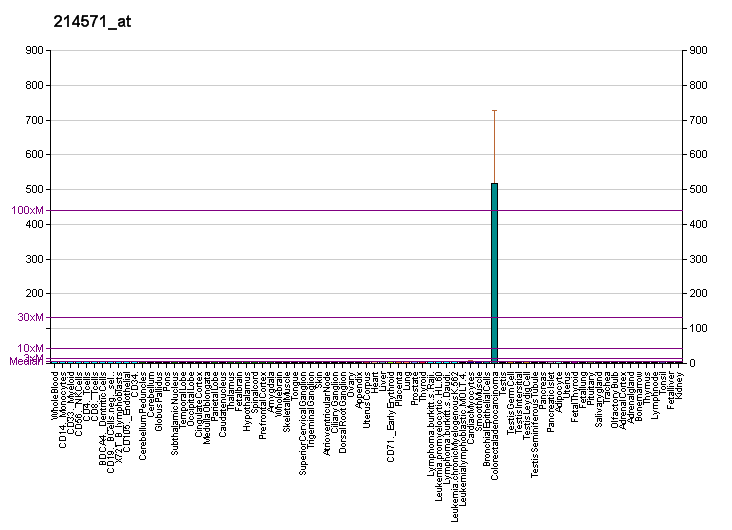
RNA expression pattern
Bgee	Human / Mouse (ortholog); Top expressed in: cerebellar hemisphere; right hemisphere of cerebellum; spinal cord; C1 segment; frontal lobe; Cortex of frontal lobe; ventricle of the heart; left ventricle; integument; dorsolateral prefrontal cortex / Top expressed in: embryo; inner nuclear layer; tail of embryo; outer plexiform layer; primitive streak; endoderm; dental papilla; mesoderm; inner plexiform layer; morula; More reference expression data
BioGPS	More reference expression data
Gene ontology
Molecular function	fibroblast growth factor receptor binding; protein binding; growth factor activity; 1-phosphatidylinositol-3-kinase activity; phosphatidylinositol-4,5-bisphosphate 3-kinase activity; protein tyrosine kinase activity
Cellular component	extracellular region; intracellular anatomical structure
Biological process	cell differentiation; cell-cell signaling; anatomical structure morphogenesis; MAPK cascade; multicellular organism development; fibroblast growth factor receptor signaling pathway; negative regulation of cardiac muscle tissue development; positive regulation of cell population proliferation; positive regulation of cell division; signal transduction; phosphatidylinositol phosphate biosynthetic process; phosphatidylinositol-3-phosphate biosynthetic process; peptidyl-tyrosine phosphorylation; regulation of signaling receptor activity; positive regulation of protein kinase B signaling
Sources:Amigo / QuickGO
Orthologs
Databases	NCBI: entry; OMA: entry
Species	Human	Mouse
Entrez	2248	14174
Ensembl	ENSG00000186895	ENSMUSG00000031074
UniProt	P11487	n/a
RefSeq (mRNA)	NM_005247	NM_008007
RefSeq (protein)	NP_005238	n/a
Location (UCSC)	Chr 11: 69.81 – 69.82 Mb	Chr 7: 144.39 – 144.4 Mb
PubMed search
- Wikidata
View/Edit Human	View/Edit Mouse

INT-2 proto-oncogene protein also known as FGF-3 is a protein that in humans is encoded by the FGF3 gene.

== Function ==
FGF-3 is a member of the fibroblast growth factor family. FGF3 binds to Fibroblast Growth Factor Receptor 3 (FGFR3) to serve as a negative regulator of bone growth during ossification. Effectively, FGF-3 inhibits proliferation of chondrocytes within growth plate.

FGF family members possess broad mitogenic and cell survival activities and are involved in a variety of biological processes including embryonic development, cell growth, morphogenesis, tissue repair, tumor growth and invasion.

== Clinical significance ==
The FGF3 gene was identified by its similarity with mouse fgf3/int-2, a proto-oncogene activated in virally induced mammary tumors in the mouse. Frequent amplification of this gene has been found in human tumors, which may be important for neoplastic transformation and tumor progression. Studies of the similar genes in mouse and chicken suggested the role in inner ear formation. Also, haploinsufficiency in the FGF3 gene is thought to cause otodental syndrome.

== Interactions ==
FGF3 (gene) has been shown to interact with EBNA1BP2.
