= Otodental syndrome =

- Other names: Otodental dysplasia
- Otodental syndrome is inherited in an autosomal dominant manner.
- Frequency: 0.0001%

Otodental syndrome, also known as otodental dysplasia, is an exceptionally rare disease that is distinguished by a specific phenotype known as globodontia that in rare cases can be associated with eye coloboma and high-frequency hearing loss. Globodontia is an abnormal condition that can occur in both the primary and secondary dentition, except for the incisors which are normal in shape and size. This is demonstrated by significant enlargement of the canine and molar teeth. The premolars are either reduced in size or are absent. In some cases, the defects affecting the teeth, eye and ear can be either individual or combined. When these conditions are combined with eye coloboma, the condition is also known as oculo-otodental syndrome. The first known case of otodental syndrome was found in Hungary in a mother and her son by Denes and Csiba in 1969. Prevalence is less than 1 out of every 1 million individuals. The cause of otodental syndrome is considered to be genetic. It is an autosomal dominant inheritance and is variable in its expressivity. Haploinsufficiency in the fibroblast growth factor 3 (FGF3) gene (11q13) has been reported in patients with otodental syndrome and is thought to cause the phenotype. Both males and females are equally affected. Individuals diagnosed with otodental syndrome can be of any age; age is not a relevant factor. Currently there are no specific genetic treatments for otodental syndrome. Dental and orthodontic management are the recommended course of action.

== Symptoms and signs ==
Symptoms of otodental syndrome can and usually appear in early development and progress with age. Although the specific frequency of the symptoms is not known, the duration is recognized to be for life; assuming no treatment has been undergone. The symptoms are variable to each individual, can range greatly in severity and are dependent on gene expression.

More severe symptoms include:

- Globodontia – an abnormal condition that can occur in both primary and secondary tooth development, in which the molars and canines are greatly enlarged. It refers to the enlarged bulbous fused malformed posterior teeth with almost no discernible cusps or grooves. The molars are known to have a rounded globe-like shape. Can attribute to pain.
- Sensorineural hearing loss (SNHL) – also known as nerve related hearing loss, is a form of hearing loss associated with complications within the inner ear.
- Taurodontism – known as a condition in which the body of a tooth is enlarged at the expense of the roots. This results in an enlarged pulp chamber, lack of proper bonding at the cementoenamel junction, and can cause the pulpal floor to be displaced towards the root. Discomfort and pain are usually associated with these characteristics.
- Endodontic-Periodontic lesions – oral lesions that can potentially form into abscesses. May cause further soreness and pain.

Other possible, less severe, symptoms involve:

- Absent premolars – individuals with otodental syndrome will typically lack the ability to develop premolars due to its genetic related affects.
- Ocular coloboma – an existent hole within the eye of the individual. The hole can be present in either the iris, choroid, optic disc, or retina and is acquired during early/prenatal development. Individuals with these symptoms may exhibit sensitivity to light, blurred vision, and/or blind spots; depending on the size of the missing tissue and its location in the eye.

== Mechanism ==
Otodental syndrome is a rare condition that is genetically inherited in an autosomal dominant manner. Although there is no specific biological mechanism for otodental syndrome, what is recognized is that there is a genetic mutation, known as haploinsufficiency, that occurs in the fibroblast growth factor 3 (FGF3) gene (11q13). This is the alleged cause of the physical abnormalities and symptoms associated with otodental syndrome. Although in individuals with signs of ocular coloboma, a microdeletion in the Fas-associated death domain (FADD) gene (11q13.3) was also found to be responsible. There is variable penetrance and variable gene expression within these genetic mutations. Individuals with sensorineural hearing loss are believed to have a local lesion in the auditory segment of the inner ear, known as the cochlea. The biological mechanism for this is currently unknown as well.

== Diagnosis ==
Diagnosis of otodental syndrome was established using clinical, histopathological and audiometric methodologies. In normal individuals, by the age of 2-3, radiograph images should depict any signs of premolar development. A formal diagnosis of no premolar growth can be done by age 6 in order to check for signs of otodental syndrome. Sensorineural hearing loss can be another measure for proper diagnosis as well as checking for ocular coloboma. The latter is usually noticed at an around birth.

Molecular genetic testing can aid in the diagnosis of the affected individual, which would determine if there are any abnormalities in the FGF3 gene (11q13) or the FADD gene (11q13.3). Additional tests that can help diagnose otodental syndrome are ear infection tests, hearing tests, oral examination, and eye examinations to check for the specific phenotypic associations. Due to the rarity of otodental syndrome, most symptoms are looked at on an individual basis unless multiple symptoms are all apparent at once.

There is potential for differential diagnosis due to similarities in symptoms. Other diseases that share common symptoms are chondroectodermal dysplasia, achondrodysplasia, and osteopetrosis

== Treatment ==
There is currently no specified treatment for individuals with otodental syndrome. Considering that there are many possible genetic and phenotypic associations with the condition, treatment is provided based on each individual circumstance. It is recommended that those affected seek ear, nose & throat specialists, dental health specialists, and facial oral health specialists immediately; in order to determine potential treatment options.

Common treatment methods given are:

- Dental treatment/management – which can be complex, interdisciplinary and requires a regular follow up. Tooth extraction(s)and if needed, medications may be administered for pain, anxiety, and anti-inflammation. The affected individual is usually placed on a strict and preventative dental regiment in order to maintain appropriate oral hygiene and health.
- Endodontic treatment – individuals consult with an endodontist to analyze the individuals dental pulp. Typically endodontic treatment proves to be difficult due to duplicated pulp canals within the affected teeth. There may be a need for multiple extractions as well. Dental prosthesis and/or dental implants may be necessary for individuals that lack proper oral function, appearance, and comfort.
- Orthodontic treatment – given the predicament of the size and location of the affected oral area, molars and canines, orthodontic treatment is generally required in order treat any problems associated with the individuals bite pattern and tooth appearance.
- Hearing aids – in some cases affected individuals will have hearing imparities and it may be necessary for hearing aid use.

== Prognosis ==
The functional prognosis is mostly good with those with otodental syndrome. Appropriate dental treatment, hearing aids, and visitation to necessary specialists are recommended. Quality of life may be affected by psychological and functional aspects. It is also recommended that genetic counseling be given to families that have or may have this condition.

== Recent research ==
Currently there are no open research studies for otodental syndrome. Due to the rarity of this disease, current research is very limited.

The most recent research has involved case studies of the affected individuals and/or families, all of which show the specific phenotypic symptoms of otodental syndrome. Investigations on the effects of FGF3 and FADD have also been performed. These studies have shown successes in supporting previous studies that mutations to FGF3 and neighboring genes may cause the associated phenotypic abnormalities. According to recent studies involving zebrafish embryos, there is also support in that the FADD gene contributed to ocular coloboma symptoms as well.

Future research studies are required in order to better grasp the specific relationship between the gene involved and its effect on various tissues and organs such as teeth, eyes, and ear. Little is known and there is still much to be determined.
