= DDX52 =

Protein-coding gene in the species Homo sapiens

Identifiers
- Aliases: DDX52, HUSSY19, ROK1, DEAD-box helicase 52, DExD-box helicase 52
- External IDs: OMIM: 612500; MGI: 1925644; GeneCards: DDX52
Available structures
| PDB | Ortholog search: PDBe RCSB |
| PDB | List of PDB id codes 3DKP |
Enzyme activity
| EC # | BRENDA | ExPASy | KEGG | MetaCyc |
|---|---|---|---|---|
| 3.6.4.13 | ↗ | ↗ | ↗ | ↗ |

Gene location (Human)
| Chr. | Chromosome 17 (human) |
| Band | 17q12 | Start | 37,609,739 bp |
| Band | 17q12 | End | 37,643,446 bp |

Gene location (Mouse)
| Chr. | Chromosome 11 (mouse) |
| Band | 11|11 C | Start | 83,832,888 bp |
| Band | 11|11 C | End | 83,853,914 bp |
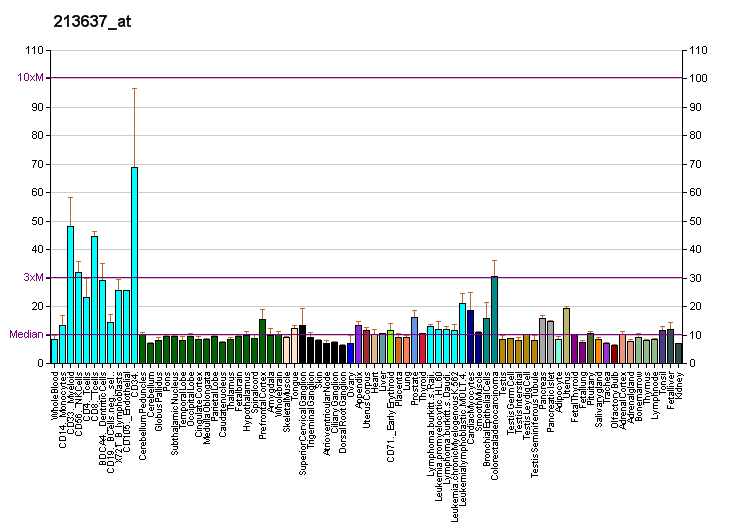

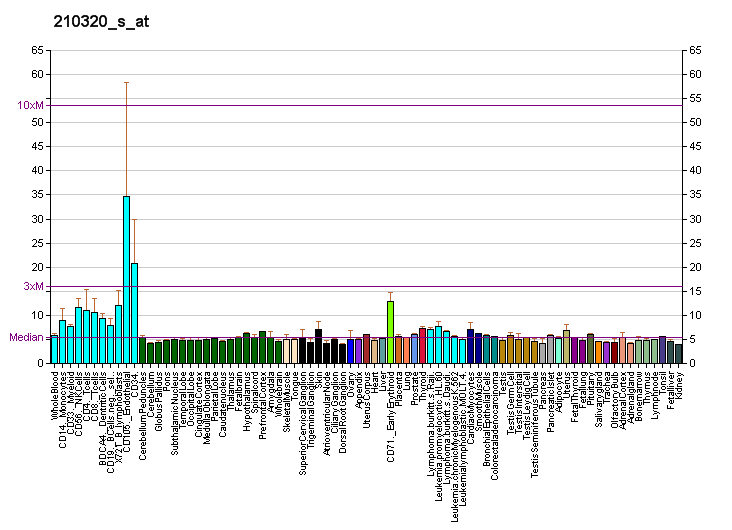
RNA expression pattern
| Bgee | Human / Mouse (ortholog); Top expressed in: sural nerve; endometrium; testicle; ganglionic eminence; islet of Langerhans; ventricular zone; rectum; gonad; smooth muscle tissue; Achilles tendon / Top expressed in: genital tubercle; spermatocyte; tail of embryo; ventricular zone; primitive streak; morula; epiblast; otic vesicle; endothelial cell of lymphatic vessel; medullary collecting duct; More reference expression data |
| BioGPS | More reference expression data |
Gene ontology
| Molecular function | nucleotide binding; hydrolase activity; ATP binding; helicase activity; nucleic acid binding; RNA binding |
| Cellular component | membrane; nucleoplasm; nucleus; nucleolus; cytoplasm |
| Biological process | RNA secondary structure unwinding; rRNA processing |
Sources:Amigo / QuickGO
Orthologs
| Databases | NCBI: entry; OMA: entry |
| Species | Human | Mouse |
| Entrez | 11056 | 78394 |
| Ensembl | ENSG00000277594; ENSG00000278053 | ENSMUSG00000020677 |
| UniProt | Q9Y2R4 | Q8K301 |
| RefSeq (mRNA) | NM_001291476; NM_007010; NM_152300 | NM_030096 |
| RefSeq (protein) | NP_001278405; NP_008941 | NP_084372 |
| Location (UCSC) | Chr 17: 37.61 – 37.64 Mb | Chr 11: 83.83 – 83.85 Mb |
| PubMed search |
- Wikidata
| View/Edit Human | View/Edit Mouse |

Probable ATP-dependent RNA helicase DDX52 is an enzyme that in humans is encoded by the DDX52 gene.
