= CYP2W1 =

Protein-coding gene in the species Homo sapiens

Identifiers
- Aliases: CYP2W1, cytochrome P450 family 2 subfamily W member 1
- External IDs: OMIM: 615967; MGI: 3616076; GeneCards: CYP2W1

Gene location (Human)
Chr.	Chromosome 7 (human)
Band	7p22.3	Start	983,181 bp
Band	7p22.3	End	989,640 bp

Gene location (Mouse)
Chr.	Chromosome 5 (mouse)
Band	5|5 G2	Start	139,338,372 bp
Band	5|5 G2	End	139,342,788 bp
RNA expression pattern
Bgee	Human / Mouse (ortholog); Top expressed in: buccal mucosa cell; right adrenal cortex; left adrenal cortex; vena cava; skin of abdomen; skin of leg; dorsal motor nucleus of vagus nerve; internal globus pallidus; sural nerve; trabecular bone / Top expressed in: lip; embryo; zone of skin; esophagus; genital tubercle; ileum; colon; stomach; jejunum; limb; More reference expression data
BioGPS	n/a
Gene ontology
Molecular function	iron ion binding; oxidoreductase activity; heme binding; oxidoreductase activity, acting on paired donors, with incorporation or reduction of molecular oxygen; metal ion binding; monooxygenase activity; arachidonic acid epoxygenase activity; steroid hydroxylase activity; oxidoreductase activity, acting on paired donors, with incorporation or reduction of molecular oxygen, reduced flavin or flavoprotein as one donor, and incorporation of one atom of oxygen
Cellular component	cell surface; plasma membrane; endoplasmic reticulum lumen; endoplasmic reticulum membrane; endoplasmic reticulum; membrane; cytoplasm; intracellular membrane-bounded organelle
Biological process	xenobiotic metabolic process; epoxygenase P450 pathway; organic acid metabolic process
Sources:Amigo / QuickGO
Orthologs
Databases	NCBI: entry; OMA: entry
Species	Human	Mouse
Entrez	54905	545817
Ensembl	ENSG00000073067	ENSMUSG00000029541
UniProt	Q8TAV3	E9Q816
RefSeq (mRNA)	NM_017781	NM_001160265
RefSeq (protein)	NP_060251	NP_001153737
Location (UCSC)	Chr 7: 0.98 – 0.99 Mb	Chr 5: 139.34 – 139.34 Mb
PubMed search
- Wikidata
View/Edit Human	View/Edit Mouse

CYP2W1 (cytochrome P450, family 2, subfamily W, polypeptide 1) is a protein that in humans is encoded by the CYP2W1 gene.

This gene encodes a member of the cytochrome P450 superfamily of enzymes. The cytochrome P450 proteins are monooxygenases which catalyze many reactions involved in drug metabolism and synthesis of cholesterol, steroids and other lipids. CYP2W1 is an interesting enzyme since it is mainly expressed in tumors and not in normal human tissue.
