= THAP1 =

Protein-coding gene in the species Homo sapiens

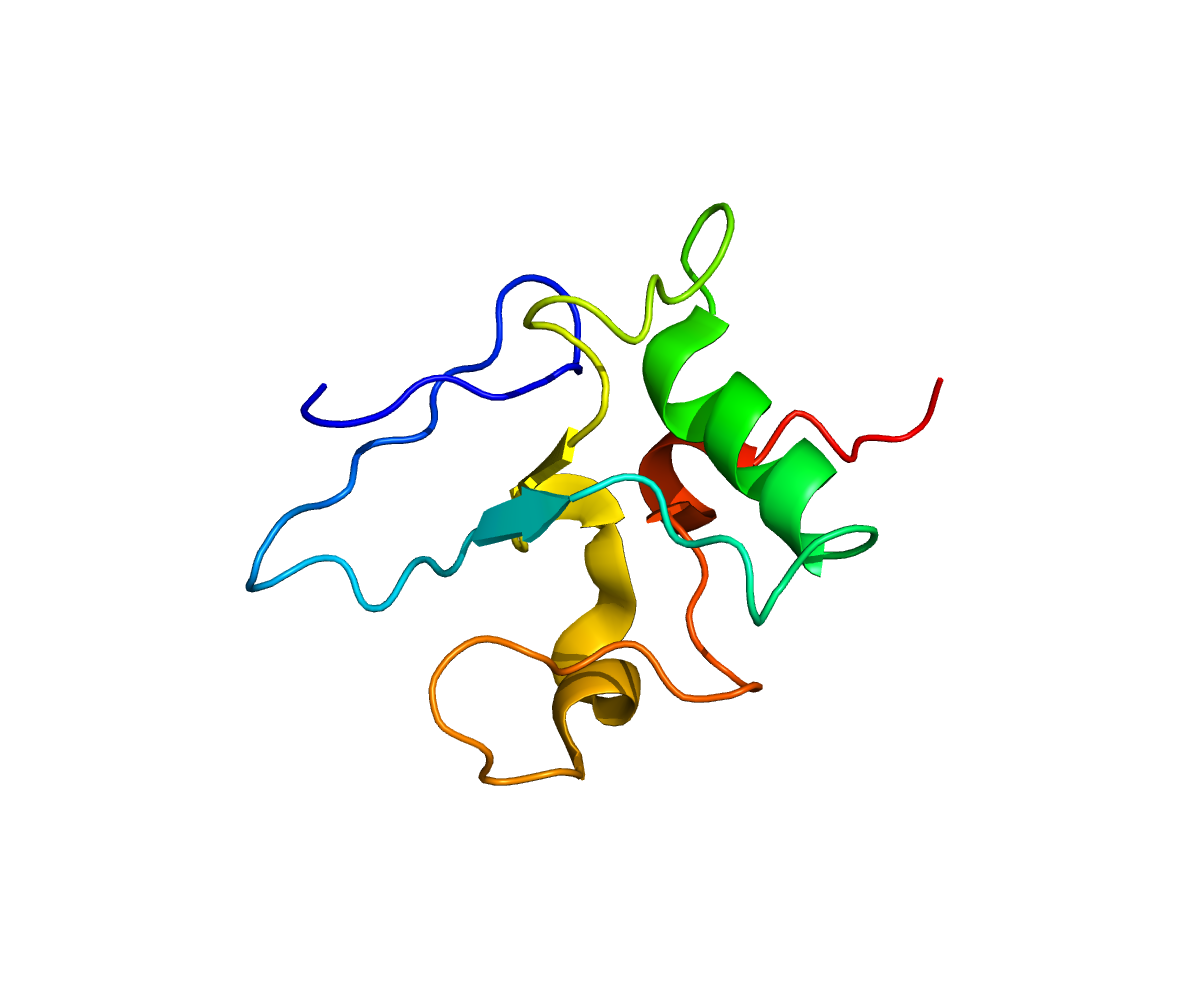

Identifiers
- Aliases: THAP1, DYT6, THAP domain containing, apoptosis associated protein 1, THAP domain containing 1
- External IDs: OMIM: 609520; MGI: 1921004; GeneCards: THAP1
Available structures
| PDB | Ortholog search: PDBe RCSB |
| PDB | List of PDB id codes 2JTG, 2KO0, 2L1G |

Gene location (Human)
| Chr. | Chromosome 8 (human) |
| Band | 8p11.21 | Start | 42,836,674 bp |
| Band | 8p11.21 | End | 42,843,325 bp |

Gene location (Mouse)
| Chr. | Chromosome 8 (mouse) |
| Band | 8|8 A2 | Start | 26,648,169 bp |
| Band | 8|8 A2 | End | 26,654,179 bp |
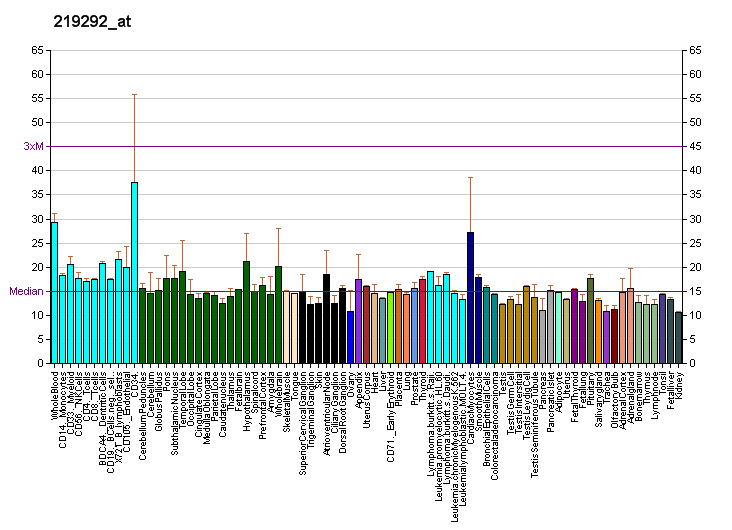
RNA expression pattern
| Bgee | Human / Mouse (ortholog); Top expressed in: secondary oocyte; gonad; testicle; muscle of thigh; Achilles tendon; buccal mucosa cell; Epithelium of choroid plexus; monocyte; gastrocnemius muscle; ganglionic eminence / Top expressed in: primary oocyte; spermatocyte; interventricular septum; secondary oocyte; otolith organ; zygote; trigeminal ganglion; utricle; otic vesicle; hand; More reference expression data |
| BioGPS | More reference expression data |
Gene ontology
| Molecular function | metal ion binding; sequence-specific DNA binding; DNA binding; zinc ion binding; protein binding; identical protein binding; nucleic acid binding; RNA polymerase II cis-regulatory region sequence-specific DNA binding; DNA-binding transcription repressor activity, RNA polymerase II-specific; protein homodimerization activity; DNA-binding transcription factor activity, RNA polymerase II-specific |
| Cellular component | PML body; intracellular membrane-bounded organelle; nucleus; nucleoplasm; fibrillar center |
| Biological process | cell cycle; endothelial cell proliferation; regulation of mitotic cell cycle; transcription, DNA-templated; regulation of transcription, DNA-templated; negative regulation of transcription by RNA polymerase II |
Sources:Amigo / QuickGO
Orthologs
| Databases | NCBI: entry; OMA: entry |
| Species | Human | Mouse |
| Entrez | 55145 | 73754 |
| Ensembl | ENSG00000131931 | ENSMUSG00000037214 |
| UniProt | Q9NVV9 | Q8CHW1 |
| RefSeq (mRNA) | NM_199003; NM_018105 | NM_199042 |
| RefSeq (protein) | NP_060575; NP_945354 | NP_950243 |
| Location (UCSC) | Chr 8: 42.84 – 42.84 Mb | Chr 8: 26.65 – 26.65 Mb |
| PubMed search |
- Wikidata
| View/Edit Human | View/Edit Mouse |

THAP domain-containing protein 1 is a protein that in humans is encoded by the THAP1 gene. The synonyme is DYT6 (Dystonia 6).

== Function ==
The protein encoded by this gene contains a THAP domain, a conserved DNA-binding domain. This protein colocalizes with the apoptosis response protein PAWR/PAR-4 in promyelocytic leukemia (PML) nuclear bodies, and functions as a proapoptotic factor that links PAWR to PML nuclear bodies. Alternatively spliced transcript variants encoding distinct isoforms have been observed.

== Interactions ==
THAP1 has been shown to interact with PAWR.

== Clinical significance ==
Thanatos-associated [THAP] domain-containing apoptosis-associated protein 1 (THAP1) is a DNA-binding protein that has been associated with DYT6 dystonia, a hereditary movement disorder involving sustained, involuntary muscle contractions.
