= 23S rRNA (uridine2552-2'-O)-methyltransferase =

Class of enzymes

Identifiers
- EC no.: 2.1.1.166

Databases
- IntEnz: IntEnz view
- BRENDA: BRENDA entry
- ExPASy: NiceZyme view
- KEGG: KEGG entry
- MetaCyc: metabolic pathway
- PRIAM: profile
- PDB structures: RCSB PDB PDBe PDBsum
Search
- PMC: articles
- PubMed: articles
- NCBI: proteins

23S rRNA (uridine^{255}2-2'-O)-methyltransferase (EC 2.1.1.166, Um(2552) 23S ribosomal RNA methyltransferase, heat shock protein RrmJ, RrmJ, FTSJ, Um^{2552} methyltransferase) is an enzyme with systematic name S-adenosyl-L-methionine:23S rRNA (uridine^{2552}-2'-O-)-methyltransferase. This enzyme catalyses the following chemical reaction

S-adenosyl-L-methionine + uridine^{2552} in 23S rRNA $\rightleftharpoons$ S-adenosyl-L-homocysteine + 2'-O-methyluridine^{2552} in 23S rRNA

The enzyme catalyses the 2'-O-methylation of the universally conserved U^{2552} in the A loop of 23S rRNA.
