= EBNA1BP2 =

Protein-coding gene in humans

Identifiers
- Aliases: EBNA1BP2, EBP2, NOBP, P40, EBNA1 binding protein 2
- External IDs: OMIM: 614443; MGI: 1916322; GeneCards: EBNA1BP2

Gene location (Human)
Chr.	Chromosome 1 (human)
Band	1p34.2	Start	43,164,175 bp
Band	1p34.2	End	43,270,936 bp

Gene location (Mouse)
Chr.	Chromosome 4 (mouse)
Band	4|4 D2.1	Start	118,477,996 bp
Band	4|4 D2.1	End	118,484,973 bp
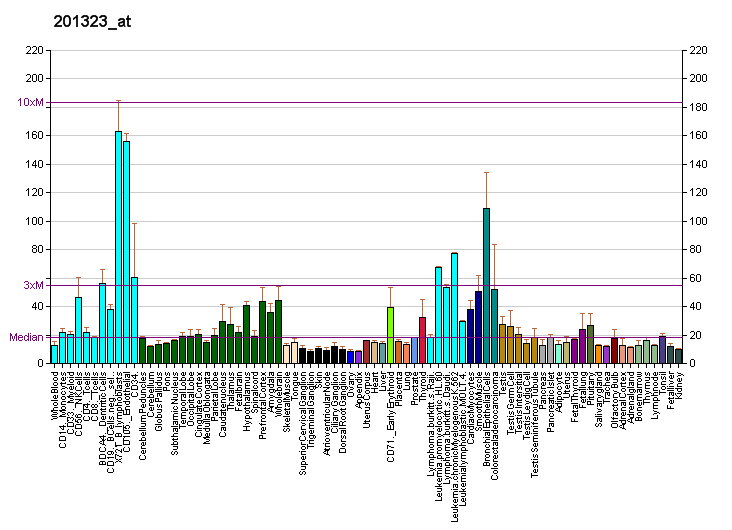
RNA expression pattern
Bgee	Human / Mouse (ortholog); Top expressed in: right lobe of liver; anterior pituitary; tendon of biceps brachii; right testis; left testis; right frontal lobe; Achilles tendon; islet of Langerhans; Brodmann area 9; olfactory zone of nasal mucosa / Top expressed in: tail of embryo; genital tubercle; otic placode; epiblast; embryo; ventricular zone; embryo; morula; primitive streak; somite; More reference expression data
BioGPS	More reference expression data
Gene ontology
Molecular function	RNA binding; protein binding
Cellular component	nucleus; nuclear periphery; preribosome, large subunit precursor; nucleolus
Biological process	ribosome biogenesis; ribosomal large subunit biogenesis; rRNA processing
Sources:Amigo / QuickGO
Orthologs
Databases	NCBI: entry; OMA: entry
Species	Human	Mouse
Entrez	10969	69072
Ensembl	ENSG00000117395	ENSMUSG00000028729
UniProt	Q99848; Q6IB29	Q9D903
RefSeq (mRNA)	NM_006824; NM_001159936	NM_026932
RefSeq (protein)	NP_001153408; NP_006815; NP_006815.2	NP_081208
Location (UCSC)	Chr 1: 43.16 – 43.27 Mb	Chr 4: 118.48 – 118.48 Mb
PubMed search
- Wikidata
View/Edit Human	View/Edit Mouse

Probable rRNA-processing protein EBP2 is a protein that in humans is encoded by the EBNA1BP2 gene.

== Interactions ==
EBNA1BP2 has been shown to interact with FGF3.
