= KIDINS220 =

Gene of the species Homo sapiens

Identifiers
- Aliases: KIDINS220, ARMS, kinase D-interacting substrate 220kDa
- External IDs: OMIM: 615759; MGI: 1924730; GeneCards: KIDINS220

Gene location (Mouse)
Chr.	Chromosome 12 (mouse)
Band	12|12 A1.3	Start	25,024,924 bp
Band	12|12 A1.3	End	25,113,151 bp
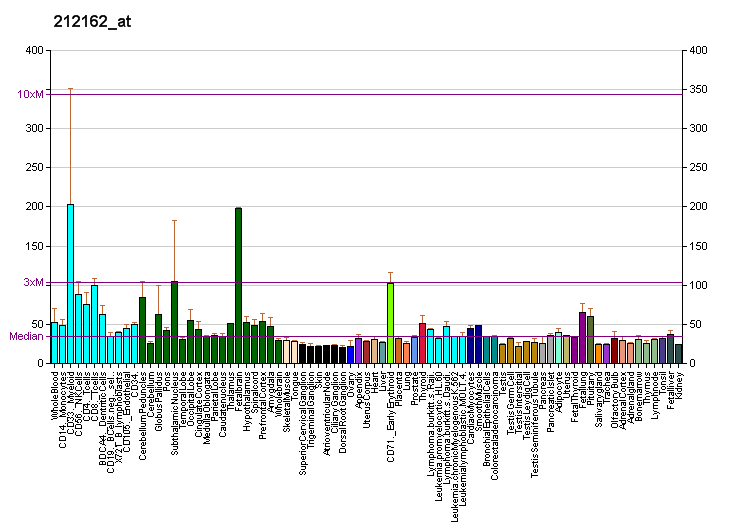

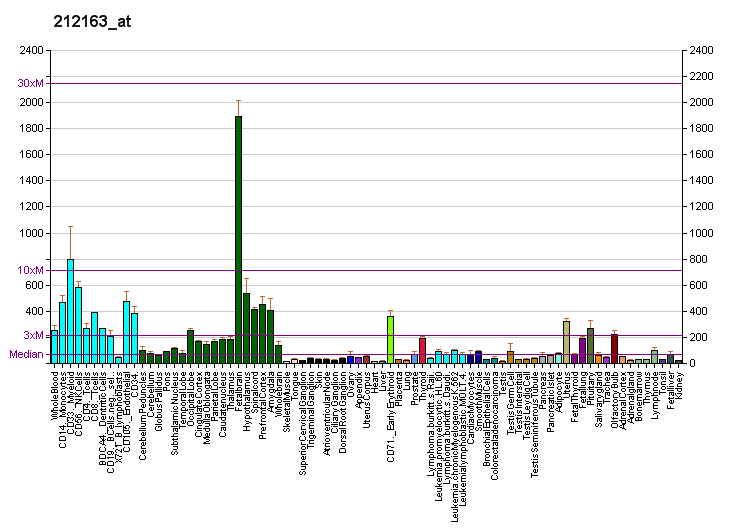

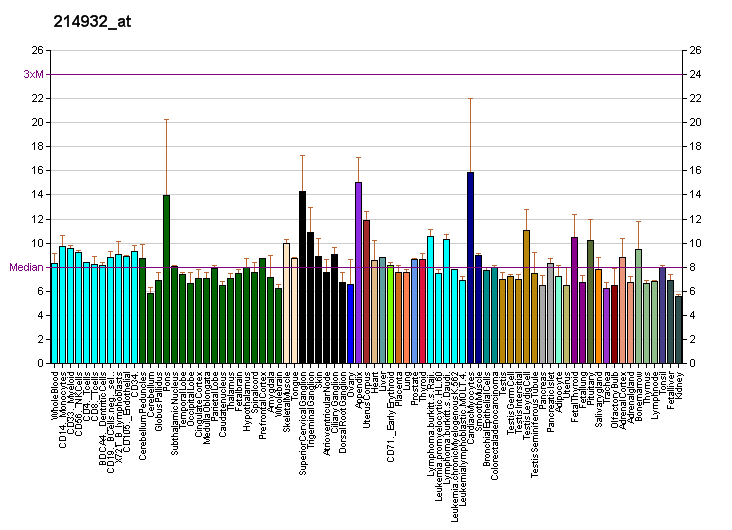
RNA expression pattern
Bgee	Human / Mouse (ortholog); n/a / Top expressed in: vestibular membrane of cochlear duct; trigeminal ganglion; neural layer of retina; superior cervical ganglion; otolith organ; utricle; Rostral migratory stream; molar; substantia nigra; facial motor nucleus
BioGPS	More reference expression data
Gene ontology
Molecular function	protein kinase regulator activity; PDZ domain binding
Cellular component	integral component of membrane; cytosol; late endosome; endosome; membrane; protein-containing complex
Biological process	regulation of protein kinase activity; cellular response to nerve growth factor stimulus; in utero embryonic development; dendrite morphogenesis; nervous system development; positive regulation of neuron projection development; nerve growth factor signaling pathway
Sources:Amigo / QuickGO
Orthologs
Databases	NCBI: entry; OMA: entry
Species	Human	Mouse
Entrez	57498	77480
Ensembl	ENSG00000134313	ENSMUSG00000036333
UniProt	Q9ULH0	E9Q9B7
RefSeq (mRNA)	NM_020738	NM_001081378
RefSeq (protein)	NP_065789; NP_001335658; NP_001335660; NP_001335661; NP_001335663 NP_001335664; NP_001335665; NP_001335667; NP_001335668; NP_001335669; NP_001335670; NP_001335671; NP_001335672; NP_001335674	NP_001074847
Location (UCSC)	n/a	Chr 12: 25.02 – 25.11 Mb
PubMed search
- Wikidata
View/Edit Human	View/Edit Mouse

Kinase D-interacting substrate of 220 kDa or ARMS (ankyrin repeat-rich membrane spanning) is a scaffold protein that in humans is encoded by the KIDINS220 gene.

It is a downstream target of neuronal signaling events initiated by neutrophins and ephrins. Additionally, it was shown to have important roles in the immune system by interacting with the B-cell and T-cell receptor.

== Molecular biology ==
The gene is located on the short arm of chromosome 2 (2p25.1) on the Crick strand. It is 116,550 bases in length. It encodes a transmembrane protein that is preferentially expressed in the nervous system. The protein acts as a receptor for the CRKL-C3G complex. Binding this complex results in Rap1-dependent sustained ERK activation. This, in turn, interacts with several pathways the effects of which are under active investigation.

== Clinical importance ==
Heterozygous mutations of this gene have been suggested as a cause of a syndrome consisting of spastic paraplegia, intellectual disability, nystagmus and obesity. Knock out mice with homozygous mutations have non-viable offspring with enlarged cerebral ventricles. A consanginous couple has been reported who suffered from repeated miscarriages in whom homozygous mutations of this gene were found. Post mortem showed enlarged cerebral ventricles and contracted limbs.
