= Mir-185 microRNA precursor family =

mir-185

Identifiers
- Symbol: mir-185
- Rfam: RF00771
- miRBase family: 20

Other data
- RNA type: microRNA
- Domain: Eukaryota;
- PDB structures: PDBe

In molecular biology mir-185 microRNA is a short RNA molecule. MicroRNAs function to regulate the expression levels of other genes by several mechanisms.

== See also ==
- MicroRNA
