= LYAR =

Protein-coding gene in the species Homo sapiens

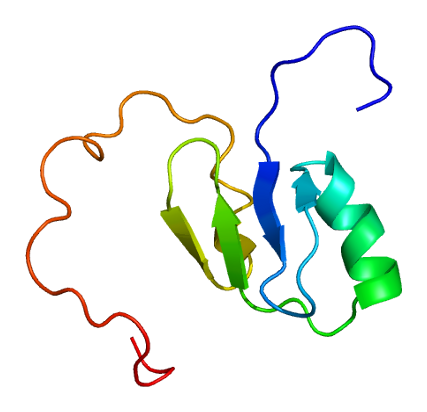

Identifiers
- Aliases: LYAR, ZC2HC2, ZLy1 antibody reactive
- External IDs: OMIM: 617684; MGI: 107470; GeneCards: LYAR
Available structures
PDB	Ortholog search: PDBe RCSB
PDB	List of PDB id codes 1WJV

Gene location (Human)
Chr.	Chromosome 4 (human)
Band	4p16.3	Start	4,267,701 bp
Band	4p16.3	End	4,290,154 bp

Gene location (Mouse)
Chr.	Chromosome 5 (mouse)
Band	5 B3|5 20.29 cM	Start	38,377,814 bp
Band	5 B3|5 20.29 cM	End	38,391,650 bp
RNA expression pattern
Bgee	Human / Mouse (ortholog); Top expressed in: secondary oocyte; left testis; sperm; right testis; granulocyte; tendon of biceps brachii; monocyte; pericardium; lymph node; myocardium of left ventricle / Top expressed in: otic placode; spermatid; otic vesicle; seminiferous tubule; spermatocyte; saccule; tail of embryo; epiblast; neural layer of retina; embryo; More reference expression data
BioGPS	n/a
Gene ontology
Molecular function	metal ion binding; protein binding; RNA binding; DNA binding
Cellular component	nucleus; nucleolus; photoreceptor outer segment; cytoplasm; cell projection
Biological process	negative regulation of transcription by RNA polymerase II; rRNA processing; erythrocyte development; positive regulation of phagocytosis
Sources:Amigo / QuickGO
Orthologs
Databases	NCBI: entry; OMA: entry
Species	Human	Mouse
Entrez	55646	17089
Ensembl	ENSG00000145220	ENSMUSG00000067367
UniProt	Q9NX58	Q08288
RefSeq (mRNA)	NM_001145725; NM_017816	NM_025281
RefSeq (protein)	NP_001139197; NP_060286	NP_079557
Location (UCSC)	Chr 4: 4.27 – 4.29 Mb	Chr 5: 38.38 – 38.39 Mb
PubMed search
- Wikidata
View/Edit Human	View/Edit Mouse

Cell growth-regulating nucleolar protein is a protein that in humans is encoded by the LYAR gene (Ly-1 antibody reactive clone).

LYAR contains a zinc finger motif and three copies of nuclear localization signals. LYAR is mainly localized to the nucleoli. LYAR is present at high levels in early embryos and preferentially in the liver fetal thymus.
