= RSL1D1 =

Protein-coding gene in the species Homo sapiens

Identifiers
- Aliases: RSL1D1, CSIG, PBK1, UTP30, L12, ribosomal L1 domain containing 1
- External IDs: OMIM: 615874; MGI: 1913659; HomoloGene: 41052; GeneCards: RSL1D1; OMA:RSL1D1 - orthologs

Gene location (Human)
Chr.	Chromosome 16 (human)
Band	16p13.13	Start	11,833,850 bp
Band	16p13.13	End	11,851,580 bp

Gene location (Mouse)
Chr.	Chromosome 16 (mouse)
Band	16|16 A1	Start	11,010,834 bp
Band	16|16 A1	End	11,021,195 bp
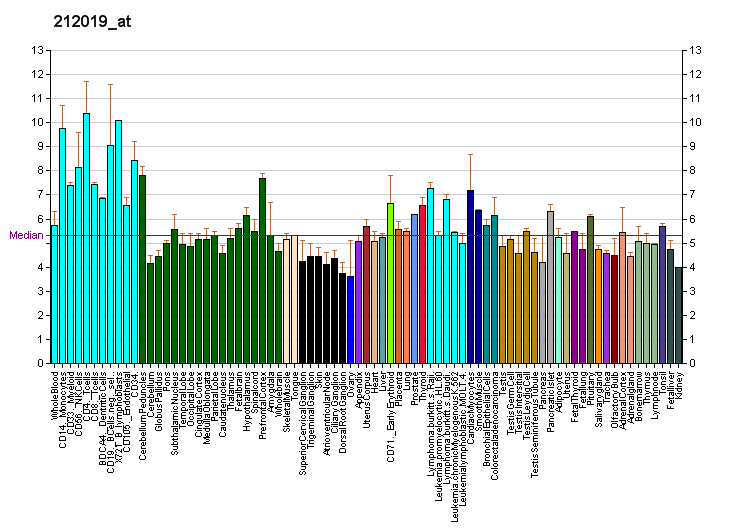

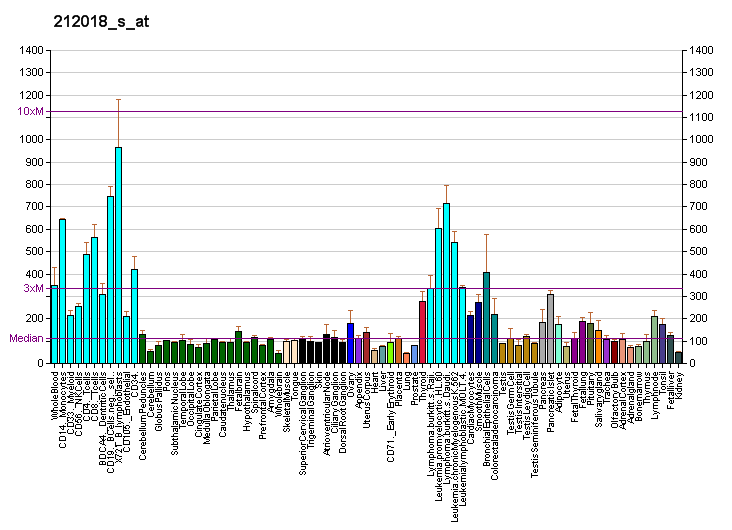
RNA expression pattern
Bgee	Human / Mouse (ortholog); Top expressed in: Achilles tendon; left ovary; monocyte; body of pancreas; gastrocnemius muscle; right ovary; ganglionic eminence; epithelium of colon; ventricular zone; beta cell / Top expressed in: tail of embryo; genital tubercle; zygote; epiblast; embryo; ventricular zone; embryo; morula; morula; abdominal wall; More reference expression data
BioGPS	More reference expression data
Gene ontology
Molecular function	cadherin binding; RNA binding; mRNA 3'-UTR binding; mRNA 5'-UTR binding
Cellular component	nucleolus; membrane; nucleus; cytosolic large ribosomal subunit; 90S preribosome
Biological process	regulation of apoptotic process; regulation of cellular senescence; osteoblast differentiation; regulation of protein localization; protein biosynthesis; maturation of LSU-rRNA
Sources:Amigo / QuickGO
Orthologs
Species	Human	Mouse
Entrez	26156	66409
Ensembl	ENSG00000171490	ENSMUSG00000005846
UniProt	O76021	Q8BVY0
RefSeq (mRNA)	NM_015659	NM_025546
RefSeq (protein)	NP_056474	NP_079822
Location (UCSC)	Chr 16: 11.83 – 11.85 Mb	Chr 16: 11.01 – 11.02 Mb
PubMed search
- Wikidata
View/Edit Human	View/Edit Mouse

Ribosomal L1 domain-containing protein 1 is a protein that in humans is encoded by the RSL1D1 gene.
