= PAWR =

Protein-coding gene in humans

Available structures
PDB	Ortholog search: PDBe RCSB
PDB	List of PDB id codes 2JK9

Identifiers
- Aliases: PAWR, Pawr, 2310001G03Rik, PAR4, Par-4, pro-apoptotic WT1 regulator
- External IDs: OMIM: 601936; MGI: 2149961; HomoloGene: 1940; GeneCards: PAWR; OMA:PAWR - orthologs

Gene location (Human)
Chr.	Chromosome 12 (human)
Band	12q21.2	Start	79,574,979 bp
Band	12q21.2	End	79,690,964 bp

Gene location (Mouse)
Chr.	Chromosome 10 (mouse)
Band	10|10 D1	Start	108,167,982 bp
Band	10|10 D1	End	108,250,101 bp
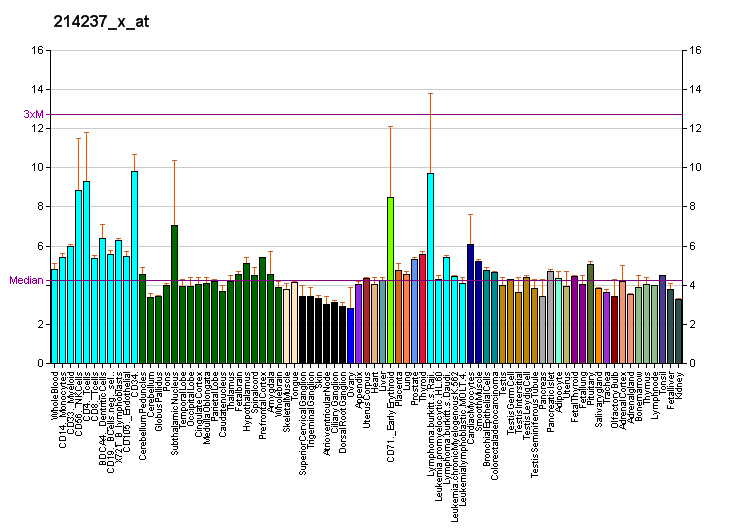

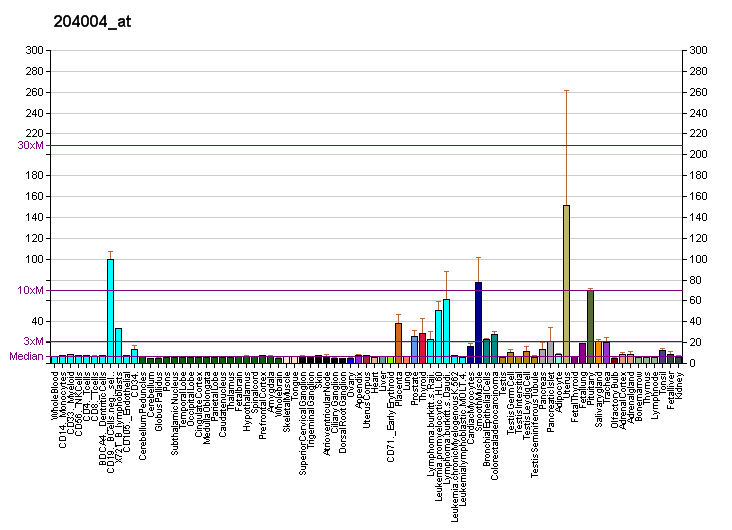

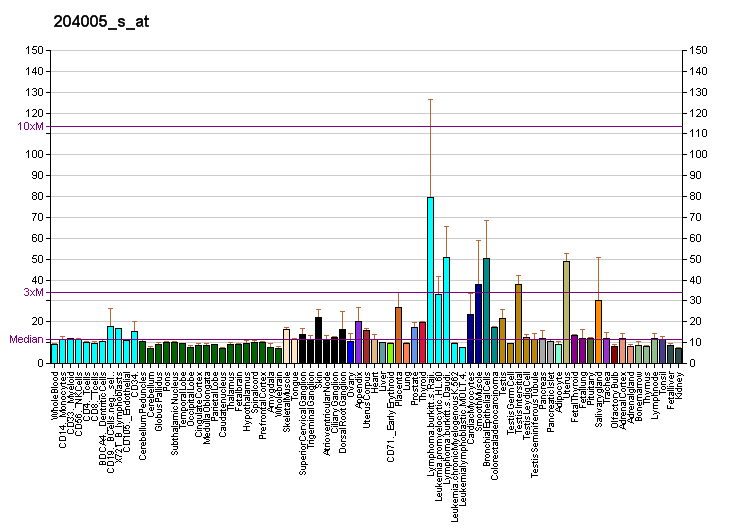
RNA expression pattern
Bgee	Human / Mouse (ortholog); Top expressed in: germinal epithelium; saphenous vein; body of uterus; epithelium of colon; right coronary artery; sural nerve; tail of epididymis; left uterine tube; myometrium; parietal pleura / Top expressed in: cumulus cell; tunica media of zone of aorta; Paneth cell; hair follicle; medullary collecting duct; renal corpuscle; ascending aorta; vestibular membrane of cochlear duct; calvaria; lacrimal gland; More reference expression data
BioGPS	More reference expression data
Gene ontology
Molecular function	transcription corepressor activity; leucine zipper domain binding; protein binding; enzyme binding; actin binding
Cellular component	cytoplasm; nucleus; actin filament
Biological process	regulation of transcription, DNA-templated; transcription, DNA-templated; actin filament bundle assembly; negative regulation of T cell receptor signaling pathway; negative regulation of T cell proliferation; positive regulation of amyloid precursor protein biosynthetic process; apoptotic signaling pathway; negative regulation of B cell proliferation; apoptotic process; negative regulation of gene expression; negative regulation of transcription by RNA polymerase II; positive regulation of cellular senescence; positive regulation of gene expression; negative regulation of fibroblast proliferation; positive regulation of hydrogen peroxide-mediated programmed cell death; positive regulation of apoptotic process
Sources:Amigo / QuickGO
Orthologs
Species	Human	Mouse
Entrez	5074	114774
Ensembl	ENSG00000177425	ENSMUSG00000035873
UniProt	Q96IZ0	Q925B0
RefSeq (mRNA)	NM_002583; NM_001354732; NM_001354733	NM_054056
RefSeq (protein)	NP_002574; NP_001341661; NP_001341662	NP_473397
Location (UCSC)	Chr 12: 79.57 – 79.69 Mb	Chr 10: 108.17 – 108.25 Mb
PubMed search
- Wikidata
View/Edit Human	View/Edit Mouse

PRKC apoptosis WT1 regulator protein, or Prostate apoptosis response-4, is a tumor-suppressor protein coded for in the human by the PAWR gene, that induces apoptosis in cancer cells, but not in normal cells.

== Function ==
The tumor suppressor WT1 represses and activates transcription. The protein encoded by this gene is a WT1-interacting protein that itself functions as a transcriptional repressor. It contains a putative leucine zipper domain which interacts with the zinc finger DNA binding domain of WT1. This protein is specifically upregulated during apoptosis of prostate cells. The active domain of the Par-4 protein has been found to confer cancer resistance in transgenic mice without compromising normal viability or aging, and may have therapeutic significance.

== Interactions ==
PAWR has been shown to interact with:

- Protein AATF,
- DAPK3,
- Protein kinase Mζ,
- SLC5A1,
- THAP1, and
- WT1.
