= FTSJ3 =

Class of enzymes

Identifiers
- Aliases: FTSJ3, EPCS3, SPB1, FtsJ homolog 3, FtsJ RNA methyltransferase homolog 3, FtsJ RNA 2'-O-methyltransferase 3
- External IDs: OMIM: 618411; MGI: 1860295; GeneCards: FTSJ3

Gene location (Human)
Chr.	Chromosome 17 (human)
Band	17q23.3	Start	63,819,433 bp
Band	17q23.3	End	63,830,012 bp

Gene location (Mouse)
Chr.	Chromosome 11 (mouse)
Band	11 E1|11 68.89 cM	Start	106,139,968 bp
Band	11 E1|11 68.89 cM	End	106,146,905 bp
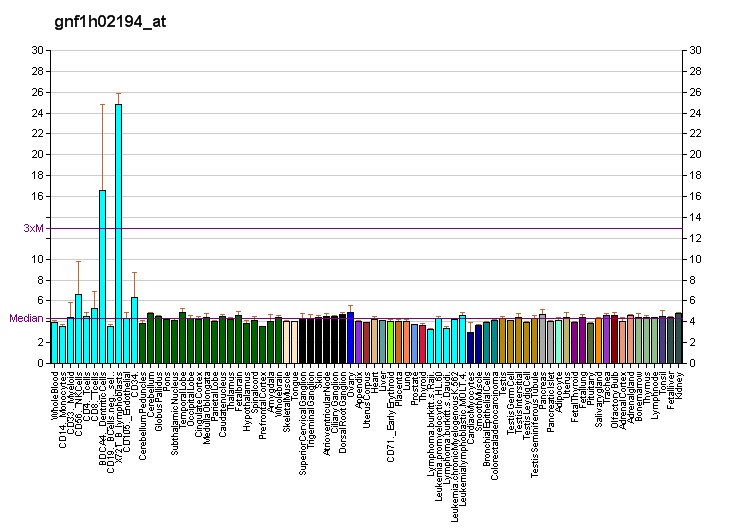

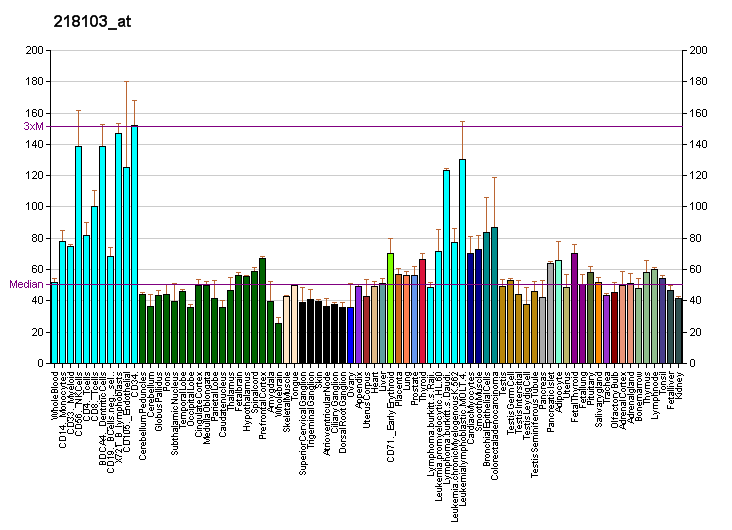
RNA expression pattern
Bgee	Human / Mouse (ortholog); Top expressed in: granulocyte; sural nerve; tendon of biceps brachii; stromal cell of endometrium; gastric mucosa; right ovary; right adrenal gland; right lobe of thyroid gland; body of uterus; canal of the cervix / Top expressed in: tail of embryo; genital tubercle; epiblast; ventricular zone; yolk sac; blastocyst; embryo; zygote; morula; morula; More reference expression data
BioGPS	More reference expression data
Gene ontology
Molecular function	methyltransferase activity; transferase activity; rRNA methyltransferase activity; protein binding; RNA binding; rRNA (uridine-2'-O-)-methyltransferase activity; rRNA (guanine) methyltransferase activity
Cellular component	nucleus; nucleolus; preribosome, large subunit precursor; preribosome, small subunit precursor
Biological process	rRNA processing; methylation; RNA methylation; ribosome biogenesis; maturation of LSU-rRNA from tricistronic rRNA transcript (SSU-rRNA, 5.8S rRNA, LSU-rRNA); maturation of 5.8S rRNA from tricistronic rRNA transcript (SSU-rRNA, 5.8S rRNA, LSU-rRNA); rRNA methylation; enzyme-directed rRNA 2'-O-methylation
Sources:Amigo / QuickGO
Orthologs
Databases	NCBI: entry; OMA: entry
Species	Human	Mouse
Entrez	117246	56095
Ensembl	ENSG00000108592	ENSMUSG00000020706
UniProt	Q8IY81	Q9DBE9
RefSeq (mRNA)	NM_017647	NM_025310
RefSeq (protein)	NP_060117	NP_079586
Location (UCSC)	Chr 17: 63.82 – 63.83 Mb	Chr 11: 106.14 – 106.15 Mb
PubMed search
- Wikidata
View/Edit Human	View/Edit Mouse

pre-rRNA 2'-O-ribose RNA methyltransferase FTSJ3 is an enzyme, an O-methyltransferase, that in humans is encoded by the FTSJ3 gene.

== Function ==
The enzyme performs 2′-O-methylation of RNA using S-adenosylmethionine as methyl donor.
