= KRR1 =

Protein-coding gene in humans

Identifiers
- Aliases: KRR1, HRB2, RIP-1, small subunit processome component homolog, KRR1 small subunit processome component homolog
- External IDs: OMIM: 612817; MGI: 1289274; GeneCards: KRR1

Gene location (Human)
Chr.	Chromosome 12 (human)
Band	12q21.2	Start	75,490,863 bp
Band	12q21.2	End	75,511,636 bp

Gene location (Mouse)
Chr.	Chromosome 10 (mouse)
Band	10 D1- D2|10 59.97 cM	Start	111,808,569 bp
Band	10 D1- D2|10 59.97 cM	End	111,824,337 bp
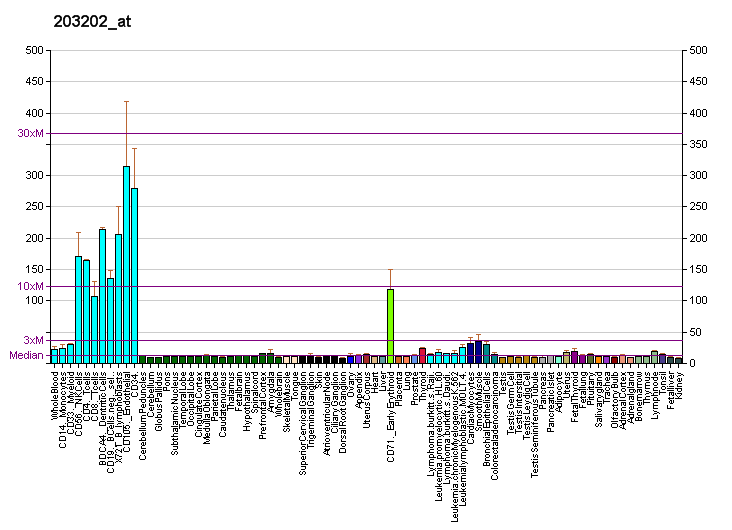

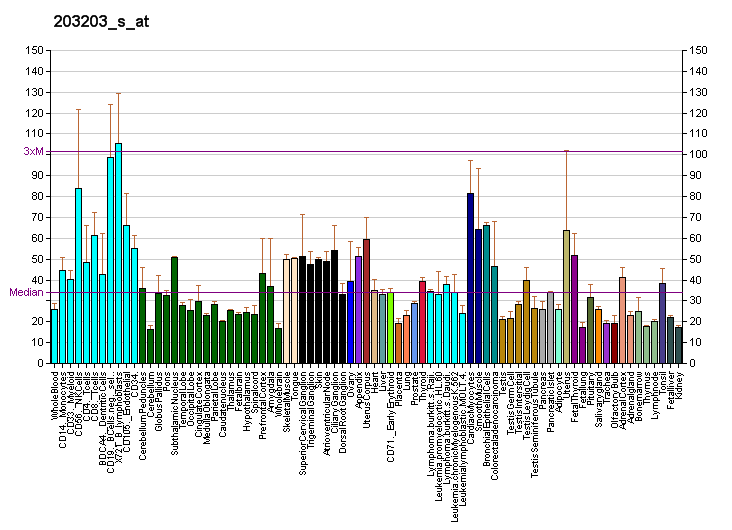
RNA expression pattern
Bgee	Human / Mouse (ortholog); Top expressed in: Achilles tendon; oocyte; secondary oocyte; caput epididymis; gonad; tail of epididymis; mucosa of paranasal sinus; corpus epididymis; tonsil; islet of Langerhans / Top expressed in: primitive streak; Paneth cell; genital tubercle; tail of embryo; fossa; abdominal wall; retinal pigment epithelium; condyle; ciliary body; vas deferens; More reference expression data
BioGPS	More reference expression data
Gene ontology
Molecular function	protein binding; nucleic acid binding; RNA binding
Cellular component	cytoplasm; small-subunit processome; nucleolus; membrane; nucleus; intercellular bridge; nucleoplasm
Biological process	ribosome biogenesis; maturation of SSU-rRNA from tricistronic rRNA transcript (SSU-rRNA, 5.8S rRNA, LSU-rRNA); rRNA processing
Sources:Amigo / QuickGO
Orthologs
Databases	NCBI: entry; OMA: entry
Species	Human	Mouse
Entrez	11103	52705
Ensembl	ENSG00000111615	ENSMUSG00000063334
UniProt	Q13601	Q8BGA5
RefSeq (mRNA)	NM_007043	NM_178610
RefSeq (protein)	NP_008974	NP_848725
Location (UCSC)	Chr 12: 75.49 – 75.51 Mb	Chr 10: 111.81 – 111.82 Mb
PubMed search
- Wikidata
View/Edit Human	View/Edit Mouse

KRR1 small subunit processome component homolog is a protein that in humans is encoded by the KRR1 gene.
