= List of genes mutated in cutaneous conditions =

A number of gene mutations have been linked to conditions of or affecting the human integumentary system.

Genes mutated in cutaneous conditions
| Gene | Protein product | Resulting condition(s) |
|---|---|---|
| ABCA12 | | Harlequin ichthyosis Lamellar ichthyosis |
| ABCB1 | P glycoprotein | |
| ABCC6 | | Pseudoxanthoma elasticum |
| ABCC7 | CFTR protein | Cystic fibrosis |
| ACVR1 | | Fibrodysplasia ossificans progressiva |
| ACVRL1 (ALK1) | Activin A | Hereditary hemorrhagic telangiectasia type 2 |
| ADAMT52 | Procollagen N-peptidase | Dermatosparaxis variant of Ehlers–Danlos syndrome |
| AGPAT2 | | Berardinelli–Seip syndrome |
| AIRE | | APECED syndrome |
| APC | | Familial polyposis coli Gardner syndrome |
| ATM | | Ataxia telangiectasia |
| ATP2A2 | SERCA2 protein | Darier disease Acrokeratosis verruciformis of Hopf |
| ATP2C1 | | Hailey–Hailey disease |
| ATP7A | | Menkes kinky hair syndrome Occipital horn syndrome Cutis laxa |
| ATP7B | | Wilson's disease |
| BHD | | Birt–Hogg–Dubé syndrome |
| BLOCK153 | BLOCK153 | Hermansky–Pudlak syndrome type 8 |
| BRAF | | Skin melanoma |
| BSCL2 | | Berardinelli–Seip syndrome |
| C282Y | | Hemochromatosis |
| C7orf11 | | Trichothiodystrophy |
| CBS | Cystathionine synthase | Homocystinuria |
| CDKN2A | | Familial melanoma syndrome |
| CHS1 (LYST) | | Chédiak–Higashi syndrome |
| CXCR4 | | WHIM syndrome |
| COL1A1 | Collagen type 1 | Osteogenesis imperfecta Arthrochalasia type of Ehlers–Danlos syndrome Classic variant of Ehlers–Danlos syndrome |
| COL1A2 | Collagen type 1 | Arthrochalasia type of Ehlers–Danlos syndrome Cardiac valvular type of Ehlers–Danlos syndrome |
| COL3A1 | Collagen type 3 | Hypermobility variant of Ehlers–Danlos syndrome Vascular variant of Ehlers–Danlos syndrome |
| COL4A5 | Collagen type 4 | Alport syndrome |
| COL5A1 | Collagen type 5 | Classic variant of Ehlers–Danlos syndrome |
| COL5A2 | Collagen type 5 | Classic variant of Ehlers–Danlos syndrome |
| CTNNB1 | Beta-catenin | Pilomatricoma |
| CX0RF5 | | Orofaciodigital syndrome |
| CYLD | | Brooke–Spiegler syndrome Cylindroma |
| DHCR7 | | Smith–Lemli–Opitz syndrome |
| DTNBP1 | Dysbindin | Hermansky–Pudlak syndrome type 7 |
| Dyskerin | | Dyskeratosis congenita |
| ECM1 | Extracellular matrix protein-1 | Lipoid proteinosis |
| EDA | | Hypohidrotic ectodermal dysplasia |
| Elastin | | Cutis laxa |
| ENG | Endoglin | Hereditary hemorrhagic telangiectasia type 1 |
| ERCC6 (CSB) | | Cockayne syndrome |
| ERCC8 (CSA) | | Cockayne syndrome |
| EVER1 (TMC6) | | Epidermodysplasia verruciformis |
| EVER2 (TCM8) | | Epidermodysplasia verruciformis |
| FGF23 | | Familial tumoral calcinosis |
| FGFR2 | | Nevus comedonicus Beare–Stevenson cutis gyrata syndrome |
| FGFR3 | | Epidermal nevus |
| Fibulin-1 | Fibulin-1 | Marfan syndrome |
| Fibulin-2 | Fibulin-2 | Congenital contractural arachnodactyly |
| Fibulin-4 | Fibulin-4 | Cutis laxa |
| Fibulin-5 | Fibulin-5 | Cutis laxa |
| FOXC2 | | Lymphedema–distichiasis syndrome Meige lymphedema |
| GALNT3 | | Familial tumoral calcinosis |
| GJB2 | Connexin 26 | KID syndrome Vohwinkel syndrome Bart–Pumphrey syndrome |
| GJB3 | Connexin 31 | Erythrokeratodermia variabilis |
| GJB4 | Connexin 30.3 | Erythrokeratodermia variabilis |
| GJB6 | Connexin 30 | Clouston syndrome (Hidrotic ectodermal dysplasia) |
| GNAS1 | | Progressive osseous heteroplasia Plate-like osteoma cutis Albright's hereditary osteodystrophy |
| GNAQ | | Blue nevus Uveal melanoma Port-wine stain Sturge-weber syndrome |
| GTF2H5 (TFBS) | | Trichothiodystrophy |
| GLA | Alpha-galactosidase | Fabry disease |
| GLUT-1 | | Infantile hemangioma |
| Hairless | | Papular atrichia |
| Hamartin | | Tuberous sclerosis type 1 |
| HFE | | Hemochromatosis |
| HPS1 | HPS1 | Hermansky–Pudlak syndrome type 1 |
| HPS3 | HPS3 | Hermansky–Pudlak syndrome type 3 |
| HPS4 | HPS4 | Hermansky–Pudlak syndrome type 4 |
| HPS5 | Ru2 | Hermansky–Pudlak syndrome type 5 |
| HPS6 | Ru | Hermansky–Pudlak syndrome type 6 |
| HRAS | | Spitz nevus |
| KIND1 | Kindlin-1 | Kindler syndrome |
| Klotho | | Familial tumoral calcinosis |
| KIT (CD117) | | Mastocytosis; Mast cell leukemia Mucosal melanoma Piebaldism |
| KRT1 | | Epidermolytic hyperkeratosis Ichthyosis hystrix of Curth–Macklin; Diffuse nonepidermolytic palmoplantar keratoderma (Unna–Thost keratoderma); Diffuse epidermolytic palmoplantar keratoderma (Vörner keratoderma) |
| KRT2 | | Ichthyosis bullosa of Siemens |
| KRT3 | | Meesmann corneal dystrophy |
| KRT4 | | White sponge nevus |
| KRT5 | | Epidermolysis bullosa simplex Dowling–Degos' disease Olmsted syndrome |
| KRT6A | | Pachyonychia congenita type I |
| KRT6B | | Pachyonychia congenita type II |
| KRT9 | | Diffuse epidermolytic palmoplantar keratoderma (Vörner keratoderma) |
| KRT10 | | Epidermolytic hyperkeratosis Ichthyosis with confetti Ichthyosis hystrix |
| KRT12 | | Meesmann corneal dystrophy |
| KRT13 | | White sponge nevus |
| KRT14 | | Epidermolysis bullosa simplex Naegeli–Franceschetti–Jadassohn syndrome Dermatopathia pigmentosa reticularis Olmsted syndrome |
| KRT16 | | Pachyonychia congenita type I |
| KRT17 | | Pachyonychia congenita type II; Steatocystoma multiplex Vellus hair cyst |
| KRT81 | | Monilethrix |
| KRT83 | | Monilethrix |
| KRT85 | | Pure hair–nail type of ectodermal dysplasia |
| KRT86 | | Monilethrix |
| LMNA | Laminin A/C | Progeria; Köbberling–Dunnigan syndrome |
| LMNB1 | Laminin B1 | Cutis laxa |
| LMNB2 | Laminin B2 | Barraquer–Simons syndrome |
| LEMD3 | | Buschke–Ollendorff syndrome |
| Lewis Y | | Infantile hemangioma |
| LMX1B | | Nail–patella syndrome |
| MATP | Membrane-associated transporter protein | Oculocutaneous albinism type 4 |
| MCR1R | | Red hair color |
| Menin (MENI) | | MEN1A (Wermer syndrome) |
| Merlin | | Neurofibromatosis type 2 |
| Merosin | | Infantile hemangioma |
| MLH1 | | Muir–Torre syndrome |
| MLPH | | Griscelli syndrome |
| MITF | | Waardenburg syndrome type 2 |
| MSH2 | | Muir–Torre syndrome |
| MSX1 | | Witkop syndrome |
| MYO5A | | Griscelli syndrome |
| NF1 | Neurofibromin | Neurofibromatosis type 1 |
| NOD2 | | Blau syndrome, Early-onset sarcoidosis |
| NOTCH3 | | CADASIL syndrome |
| NSDHL | 3-beta-hydroxysteroid dehydrogenase | CHILD syndrome |
| OCA2 (P) | P protein | Oculocutaneous albinism type 2 |
| p53 | | Li–Fraumeni syndrome Actinic keratosis Squamous cell carcinoma |
| p57 | | Beckwith–Wiedemann syndrome |
| p63 | | Hay–Wells syndrome (AEC syndrome); EEC syndrome Rapp–Hodgkin syndrome |
| PAX3 | | Waardenburg syndrome type 1 Waardenburg syndrome type 3 |
| PLEC | Plectin | Epidermolysis bullosa simplex with muscular dystrophy |
| PLOD | Lysyl hydroxylase | Kyphoscoliosis variant of Ehlers–Danlos syndrome |
| PPARG | | Köbberling–Dunnigan syndrome |
| PRKAR1 | Protein kinase A | Carney complex |
| PSTPIP1 | CD2 binding protein 1 | PAPA syndrome |
| PTCH | Patched | Nevoid basal cell carcinoma syndrome Sporadic basal cell carcinoma |
| PTEN | | Bannayan–Riley–Ruvalcaba syndrome Cowden syndrome |
| PTPN11 | | LEOPARD syndrome |
| RAB27A | | Griscelli syndrome |
| RAG1 | | Severe combined immunodeficiency |
| RAG2 | | Severe combined immunodeficiency |
| RecQL2 (WRN) | DNA helicase | Werner syndrome |
| RecQL3 (BLM) | DNA helicase | Bloom syndrome |
| RecQL4 | DNA helicase | Rothmund–Thomson syndrome |
| RET | | MEN2A, MEN2B |
| SAMD9 | | Familial tumoral calcinosis |
| SERPINA1 | Alpha 1-antitrypsin | Alpha-1 antitrypsin deficiency panniculitis |
| SLC39A4 | | Acrodermatitis enteropathica |
| SOX10 | | Waardenburg syndrome type 4 |
| SOX18 | | Hypotrichosis–lymphedema–telangiectasia syndrome |
| SPREAD1 | | Neurofibromatosis type 1-like syndrome |
| STK11 | | Peutz–Jeghers syndrome |
| TERC | | Dyskeratosis congenita |
| TGM1 | Transglutaminase 1 | Lamellar ichthyosis Nonbullous congenital ichthyosiform erythroderma |
| TGM5 | Transglutaminase 5 | Acral peeling skin syndrome |
| TNXB | Tenascin X | Classic variant of Ehlers–Danlos syndrome Hypermobility variant of Ehlers–Danlos syndrome |
| Tuberin | | Tuberous sclerosis type 2 |
| TYR | Tyrosine | Oculocutaneous albinism type 1a Oculocutaneous albinism type 1b |
| TYRP1 | Tyrosine-related protein 1 | Oculocutaneous albinism type 3 |
| FLT4 | VEGFR-3 | Milroy disease |
| VHL | | Von Hippel–Lindau disease |
| XPA | | Xeroderma pigmentosa |
| XPB | DNA helicase | Xeroderma pigmentosa Trichothiodystrophy; Xeroderma pigmentosum–Cockayne syndrome |
| XPC | | Xeroderma pigmentosa |
| XPD | DNA helicase | Xeroderma pigmentosa Trichothiodystrophy; Xeroderma pigmentosum–Cockayne syndrome |
| XPE | | Xeroderma pigmentosa |
| XPF | DNA endonuclease | Xeroderma pigmentosa |
| XPG | DNA endonuclease | Xeroderma pigmentosa Xeroderma pigmentosum–Cockayne syndrome |
| ZMPSTE24 | | Köbberling–Dunnigan syndrome Restrictive dermopathy |

== See also ==
- List of radiographic findings associated with cutaneous conditions
- List of cutaneous conditions caused by mutations in keratins
- List of contact allergens
- List of histologic stains that aid in diagnosis of cutaneous conditions
- List of target antigens in pemphigus
- List of specialized glands within the human integumentary system
- List of cutaneous conditions associated with internal malignancy
