= Anodontia =

Absence of all primary or permanent teeth at birth

- Other names: Anodontia vera
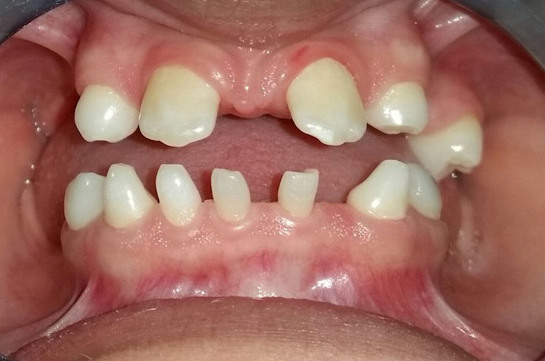
- Anodontia view of patient showing oligodontia and conical teeth
- Specialty: Dentistry, medical genetics

Anodontia is a rare genetic disorder characterized by the congenital absence of all primary or permanent teeth. It is divided into two subsections, complete absence of teeth or only some absence of teeth. It is associated with the group of skin and nerve syndromes called the ectodermal dysplasias. Anodontia is usually part of a syndrome and seldom occurs as an isolated entity. There is usually no exact cause for anodontia. The defect results in the dental lamina obstruction during embryogenesis due to local, systemic and genetic factors.

Congenital absence of permanent teeth can present as hypodontia, usually missing one or two permanent teeth, or oligodontia that is the congenital absence of six or more teeth. Congenital absence of all wisdom teeth, or third molars, is relatively common. Anodontia is the congenital absence of teeth and can occur in some or all teeth; whereas partial anodontia (or hypodontia), involves two dentitions or only teeth of the permanent dentition (Dorland's 1998). Approximately 0.08-0.25% of the population has oligodontia. Many denominations are attributed to this anomaly: partial anodontia, hypodontia, oligodontia, the congenital absence, anodontia, bilateral aplasia. Anodontia being the term used in controlled vocabulary Medical Subject Headings (MeSH) from MEDLINE which was developed by the United States National Library of Medicine. The congenital absence of at least one permanent tooth is the most common dental anomaly and may contribute to masticator dysfunction, speech impairment, aesthetic problems, and malocclusion (Shapiro and Farrington 1983). Absence of lateral incisors represents a major stereotype. Individuals with this condition are perceived as socially most aggressive compared with people without anodontia (Shaw 1981). The occurrence of anodontia is less so than hypodontia which has a prevalence of 0.1-0.7% in primary teeth and 3–7.5% in permanent teeth.

== Signs and symptoms ==
The main sign of anodontia is when a child has not developed any of their permanent teeth by the age of 12. Another sign of anodontia can include the absence of baby teeth when the baby has reached 12 to 13 months.

Symptoms that are associated with anodontia include: alopecia, lack of sweat glands, cleft lip or palate, and missing fingernails. Typically, these symptoms are seen because anodontia is typically associated with ectodermal dysplasia. In the rare case that ectodermal dysplasia is not present, anodontia will be caused from an unknown genetic mutation.

== Cause ==
Anodontia typically occurs with the presence of ectodermal dysplasia, which is a group of disorders where two or more ectodermally derived structures will have abnormal development. In the rare case that ectodermal dysplasia is not associated or present, anodontia will be caused by an unknown genetic mutation. Although no specific gene has been identified, there have been many different genes found to be associated with anodontia including EDA, EDAR, and EDARADD genes. Other genes such as MSX1, PAX9, IRF6, GREM2, AXIN2, LRP6, SMOC2, LTBP3, PITX2, and WNT10B. The WNT10A gene is considered to be the major gene involved in hypodontia and oligodontia. These genes are involved in hypodontia and oligodontia. If Anodontia is present in the maternal or paternal side, the chances of this being inherited are increased.

== Mechanisms and pathophysiology ==
Anodontia is a genetic disorder that is typically occurs in result of another syndrome. Different results can occur depending on which gene is inherited. It remains unclear which specific gene is the direct cause but it is known that several genes can play a role when inherited. Many genes are involved with this and other relating disorders. The main genes involved include: EDA, EDAR, and EDARADD genes. One working gene and one non-working gene are inherited, one from an affected parent and one from a non-affected parent, which then result in a 50% chance of the child inheriting the genetic disorder. Anodontia alone will not have an effect on any other body part besides teeth being missing.

== Associated syndromes ==
Hypodontia and anodontia are frequently associated with a multitude of genetic disorders and syndromes, approximately 70. Syndromes particularly involved with ectodermal involvement are a prime circumstance for anodontia to occur, some examples of these are: Rieger's, Robinson's and focal dermal hypoplasia. Three syndromes which classically have signs of anodontia are oculomandibulodyscephaly, mesoectodermal dysplasia and ectodermal dysplasia. In cases of oculomandibulodyscephaly there are no permanent teeth but there are deciduous teeth present. In mesoectodermal dysplasia the symptoms are anodontia and hypodontia. In cases of ectodermal dysplasia oligodontia is also present. Other symptoms associated with anodontia include: Alopecia, loss of sweat glands, cleft lip or palate, or missing finger nails.

== Diagnosis ==
Anodontia can be diagnosed when a baby does not begin to develop teeth around the age of 12 to 13 months or when a child does not develop their permanent teeth by the age of 10. The dentist can use a special X-ray, such as a panoramic image, to check if there are any teeth developing. There is also a higher risk for a child to develop anodontia if their parent has this disorder as well. In the absence of all permanent teeth, anodontia will be diagnosed. If between one and five teeth are missing, this will be diagnosed as hypodontia. In the absence of six or more teeth, this will be diagnosed as oligodontia.

== Complications ==
The complications associated with anodontia can vary but the majority results in problems with aesthetic appearance, speaking, and masticatory function. Complications may occur with the placement of the dental implant. Although it is rare, some complications may include the screw of the implant becoming loose or sore spots.

== Prevention and treatment ==
Anodontia cannot be prevented due to it being a genetic disorder. Prosthetic replacement of missing teeth is possible using dental implant technology or dentures. This treatment can be successful in giving patients with anodontia a more aesthetically pleasing appearance. The use of an implant prosthesis in the lower jaw could be recommended for younger patients as it is shown to significantly improve the craniofacial growth, social development and self-image. The study associated with this evidence worked with individuals who had ectodermal dysplasia of varying age groups of up to 11, 11 to 18 and more than 18 years. It was noted that the risk of implant failure was significantly higher in patients younger than 18 years, but there is significant reason to use this methodology of treatment in those older. Overall the use of an implant-prosthesis has a considerable functional, aesthetic and psychological advantage when compared to a conventional denture, in the patients.

== Prognosis ==
Patients diagnosed with anodontia are expected to have a normal life expectancy. Once anodontia is diagnosed, dental implants or dentures will need to be worn in order to treat this disorder. There is an 88.5% to 100% chance for dental implants in patients with ectodermal dysplasia or tooth agenesis to be successful when placed after the age of 18.

== Epidemiology ==
The prevalence of anodontia is unknown but it is a very rare disorder. Anodontia occurs in less than 2-8% of the general population in regards to permanent teeth and 0.1-0.7% in primary teeth. Gender and ethnicity do not play a role in anodontia.

== Research ==
A recent study in 2019 by R. Constance Wiener and Christopher water looked at anodontia, hypodontia, and oligodontia in children West Virginia. There is a high prevalence of children with missing permanent teeth in West Virginia compared to the rest of the nation. During this study, 500 panoramic images were taken of children between the ages of 6 and 11. Out of the 500 images taken, 60 children had at least one or more missing permanent teeth. The results showed that more females had one or more missing permanent teeth than males. From the 60 children who had missing permanent teeth, 15.5% were female and 8.8% were males.

A case study conducted in 2016 of a six-year-old boy presented with anodontia. There was no family history of anodontia and the patient did not present any other symptoms for ectodermal dysplasia. It was observed the hypodontia was present in the maxillary arch and the only teeth present were the left primary first molar and the bilateral primary second molars. It was also observed that the buccal mucosa, palate, and floor of the mouth were considered normal. The patient proceeded with oral rehabilitation and give removable denture to wear. The patient struggled in the beginning to keep wearing the denture until gradually learning to adjust to it. The family reported no problems with retention and began a monthly recall visit in order to monitor any eruptions of teeth or adjustments that needed to be made. Improvements in speech skills, communication, and self esteem were also observed after placement of the denture.

Another case study in 2013 of an eight-year-old boy who reported missing teeth, difficulty chewing, and difficulty speaking was seen to have other symptoms of ectodermal dysplasia. The father confirmed there is a family history of missing teeth. The patient also had sensitivity to heat, absence of sweating, dry skin, absent eyebrows and eyelashes, hyper pigmentation, and many other ectodermal dysplasia symptoms. After a full examination, the patient was diagnosed with complete anodontia. The patient was treated with a complete set of removable dentures. After the dentures were given, the patient's facial presentation and expressions improved. The patient was also set up for recall follow ups every six months. Drastic improvement was seen with improvements with chewing and speech.

== See also ==
- Hypodontia, the condition at which the patient has missing teeth
- Hyperdontia, meaning more than the usual number of teeth.
