= Striate keratoderma =

- Specialty: Dermatology

Striate keratodermas are a group of autosomal dominant palmoplantar keratodermas with streaking hyperkeratosis involving the fingers and extending onto the palm of the hand.

== See also ==
- Keratoderma
- Skin lesion
