= Acrokeratoelastoidosis of Costa =

- Other names: Acrokeratoelastoidosis
- Autosomal dominant is the inheritance manner for this condition
- Specialty: Dermatology Genetics
- Usual onset: Childhood, adolescence, or early 20s.
- Causes: Genetics

Acrokeratoelastoidosis of Costa or Acrokeratoelastoidosis is a hereditary form of marginal keratoderma, and can be defined as a palmoplantar keratoderma. It is distinguished by tiny, firm pearly or warty papules on the sides of the hands and, occasionally, the feet. It is less common than the hereditary type of marginal keratoderma, keratoelastoidosis marginalis.

Costa described acrokeratoelastoidosis in 1953, as a result, it is also known as Costa acrokeratoelastoidosis. Acrokeratoelastoidosis is a form of punctate palmoplantar keratoderma type 3 characterized by keratin and elastic tissue abnormalities.

There have been autosomal dominant and sporadic forms observed. Acrokeratoelastoidosis is not congenital; it develops gradually during puberty, or sometimes afterwards, and then stabilizes. In most cases, no treatment is required.

== Signs and symptoms ==
Acrokeratoelastoidosis typically manifests in children and adolescents, though reports of adult onset exist. Acrokeratoelastoidosis is characterized clinically by clusters of many asymptomatic little, round-to-oval, skin-colored/translucent, or yellowish-firm papules located along the lateral and medial margins of the hands and/or feet. Papules have a keratotic surface that is rough and can range in appearance from crateriform to umbilicated. The posteromedial border of the feet as well as the pre-tibial region have also been reported to be involved. Even though unilateral involvement has been indicated, the lesions are typically bilateral and symmetrical. Plaques can form when the papules merge.

Except for cosmetic disfigurement, lesions are usually asymptomatic in the majority of cases. Mild itchiness, hyperhidrosis, and aquagenic palmoplantar keratoderma are unusual manifestations or associations.

Although there have been isolated instances of rapid development of lesions throughout pregnancy, most lesions stabilize shortly after a couple weeks to months of onset.

== Causes ==
Although there have been instances of irregular cases, acrokeratoelastoidosis is thought to be a genodermatosis with autosomal dominant inheritance, though anecdotal reports of an autosomal recessive mode exist. Inherited acrokeratoelastoidosis is classified as a form of inherited punctate palmoplantar keratoderma (PPKP), specifically Type 3 PPKP, according to the classification of palmoplantar keratodermas (PPK). Chromosome 2 appears to be the most likely locus responsible for inherited acrokeratoelastoidosis. The AAGAB gene, which has been linked to type I PPK, has no role in acrokeratoelastoidosis.

The precise pathogenesis is unknown. Although an association of persistent trauma as well as excessive sun exposure has been reported in a few cases, no direct causal relationship has been established.

Despite the fact that lesions usually localized to the extremities dominate the clinical presentation, some workers have reported elastorrhexis. In some patients, the histopathological characteristic of this illness seen in acral papules additionally includes apparently normal-appearing skin. Factors such as repeated trauma could result in a predominance of clinical manifestation associated with the disorder over the palms and soles.

The anecdotal reports of Acrokeratoelastoidosis-like lesions within scleroderma patients stems from the disease's abnormal connective tissue metabolism. Other anecdotal observations with unknown etiology include hyperhidrosis and aquagenic PPK.

== Mechanism ==
The majority of reports to date have implicated a genetic defect involving chromosome 2. Excessive sun exposure as well as chronic trauma have been suggested as potential factors in sporadic cases.

Elastorrhexis is the disorder's histopathophysiological hallmark. Excessive generation and collection of filaggrin in the form of a dense band over the stratum granulosum before it gets incorporated into the matrix of proteins of mature epidermal keratin is believed to lead to the formation of keratotic papules. The presence of unusual dense granules in dermal fibroblasts of the lesions suggests that acrokeratoelastoidosis is the result of abnormal elastic fiber secretion rather than fiber degradation, as the name implies.

== Diagnosis ==
Polarized videodermoscopic examination of the affected thumb and index finger areas reveals focal groups of pale-to-yellowish colored papules, some with slight umbilication, scattered with pale yellow-colored structureless areas.

The most common histopathological findings are hyperkeratosis, hypergranulosis, milder acanthosis, collagen homogenization, and changes in the dermal elastic fibers, which are lesser and fragmented (elastorrhexis). Hyperkeratosis can sometimes cause depression in the underlying epithelial planes, resulting in a concavity. In the superficial dermis, there are areas of collagen homogenization with thin elastic and decreased and fragmented fibers.

Conditions considered to be members of the family of marginal and acral keratodermas, as well as other distinct disorders that involve the acral parts with comparable appearing lesions, are included in the differential diagnosis. Involvement of the edge or palmoplantar transition areas characterize marginal keratodermas, and when the dorsum of the hands and feet are involved the keratoderma are called inverse.

Some of the essential differentials include Focal acral hyperkeratosis, which is distinguishable on histopathology due to changes constrained to the epidermis and the lack of elastorrhexis, Keratoelastoidosis marginalis, which is linked to with extreme sun exposure and displays prominent actinic damage. Additional variations of acral keratoderma include hereditary papulotranslucent acrokeratoderma, acrokeratoderma hereditarium punctatum, punctate palmoplantar keratoderma, and other conditions like acrokeratosis verruciformis of Hopf, degenerative collagenous plaques, digital papular calcinosis, verruca plana, primary cutaneous amyloidosis, and mosaic acral keratoderma.

== Treatment ==
Treatment can be difficult. It is not recommended for the majority of patients. Mild keratolytics, such as salicylic acid, can help on occasion, but recurrences are common. Oral retinoids, particularly acitretin, have been indicated as the most effective treatment; however, relapse after cessation is unavoidable. One patient has benefitted from the erbium:YAG laser. During the 6-month follow-up period, there was no recurrence. Topical retinoids tend to be ineffective.

== See also ==
- Palmoplantar keratoderma
- List of cutaneous conditions
