= Nek minnit =

Internet meme from New Zealand

Nek minnit (next minute; alternatively negg minute, nek minut, "nek minute", or simply nekminit) is an Internet meme made popular by New Zealand skateboarder Levi Hawken. Hawken appeared in a viral video which shows a scooter, apparently destroyed outside a dairy. The "nek minnit" video spawned many parodies and has become a popular slang term among the people of New Zealand.

In a 2019 interview with RNZ, Hawken discussed the effects of the video on his well-being and his attempts to look for a 'silver lining' (albeit he acknowledges it to be cliché). He has had a passion for skateboarding since a young age, and works on using concrete as a medium for building sculptures.

== Video ==
Levi Hawken is a professional skateboarder (for Sector 9) from Dunedin, New Zealand who suffers from ectodermal dysplasia. The condition caused his hair and teeth to grow abnormally, which resulted in him being bullied as a child. In the "nek minnit" video, Hawken appears shirtless with a shaven head; his missing teeth have also been noted by many viewers. The video takes place in a Fairfield, Otago skatepark; Hawken announces, "Left my scooter outside the dairy; nek minnit ...", the camera then tilts to show Hawken's broken scooter. The nine-second-long clip was recorded for South in Your Mouth, an independent skate film by Colin Evans, Hawken's friend; however, the "nek minute" video was uploaded separately. The video was popularised in mid-2011, and was viewed on YouTube 600,000 times by late September 2011; at December 2011, the video had received over 1.5 million views. By August 2018, it had reached 4.4 million, and in June 2024 was at 8.1 million. The phrase "nek minute" was the sixth most searched term in New Zealand on internet search engine Google in 2011, and was voted the runner-up in the 2011 "Word of the Year" poll by website Public Address.

== Parodies ==
The TV3 show The Jono Project ran a segment on one episode titled Food in a Nek Minnit each segment featured Levi Hawken and parodied the advertisements seen weeknights on TV One called Food in a Minute. The first clip had Hawken cooking a rather complex dish in a minute. A later clip had Hawken cooking two-minute noodles and after saying Nek minnit, Hawken decided the noodles might need another minute. Hawken also appears in a separate parody of another TV3 show, "60 Nek Minnits" (a parody of "60 Minutes"), as "Mike McMinnits" (instead of "Mike McRoberts").

The phrase nek minnit has been parodied by many people and organisations:

- The New Zealand Drug Foundation wrote on Twitter: "In 2009 we conducted research into NZ drug driving habits, nek minnit we kicked off our driving high info project."
- Band Youth Empire released a single titled "Nek Minnit" on 7 October 2011.
- During the New Zealand general election, 2011 campaign:
  - Conservative Party had billboards with "Nek minnit, Conservatives" written on them.
  - New Zealand Labour Party referenced a YouTube video of the then NZ Prime Minister John Key, who was shown during the previous general election promising not to raise GST and then subsequently doing so after being elected.
- Hawken has appeared in anti drink-driving advertisements in New Zealand, billed as "The Nek Minnit".
