= Bart–Pumphrey syndrome =

- Bart–Pumphrey syndrome is inherited in an autosomal dominant fashion.
- Specialty: Dermatology

Bart–Pumphrey syndrome, also known as palmoplantar keratoderma with knuckle pads and leukonychia and deafness) is a cutaneous condition characterized by hyperkeratoses (knuckle pads) over the metacarpophalangeal, proximal and distal interphalangeal joints. It was characterized in 1967. It can be associated with GJB2.

== See also ==
- Camisa disease
- Bart syndrome
- Palmoplantar keratoderma
