= Acrokeratoelastoidosis =

Acrokeratoelastoidosis may refer to:

- Acrokeratoelastoidosis of Costa
- Acrokeratoelastoidosis lichenoides
