= Keratoderma climactericum =

- Other names: Climacteric keratoderma, Haxthausen's disease, and Acquired plantar keratoderma,
- Specialty: Dermatology

Keratoderma climactericum, also known as climacteric keratoderma, Haxthausen's disease, or acquired plantar keratoderma, is a skin condition characterized by hyperkeratosis of the palms and soles beginning at about the time of menopause.

== Causes ==
Keratoderma climactericum is either inherited through an gene mutation, or it is acquired through a change in the health or environment of the individual.

== See also ==
- Palmoplantar keratoderma
- Keratoderma
- List of cutaneous conditions
