= List of cutaneous conditions caused by mutations in keratins =

There are many different keratin proteins normally expressed in the human integumentary system. Mutations in keratin proteins in the skin can cause disease.

Cutaneous conditions caused by mutations in keratin proteins
Defective keratin type	Condition(s)
1	Epidermolytic hyperkeratosis Ichthyosis hystrix of Curth–Macklin; Diffuse nonepidermolytic palmoplantar keratoderma (Unna–Thost keratoderma); Diffuse epidermolytic palmoplantar keratoderma (Vörner keratoderma)
2 (2e)	Ichthyosis bullosa of Siemens
3	Meesmann corneal dystrophy
4	White sponge nevus
5	Epidermolysis bullosa simplex Dowling–Degos' disease Olmsted syndrome
6a	Pachyonychia congenita type I
6b	Pachyonychia congenita type II
7	
8	
9	Diffuse epidermolytic palmoplantar keratoderma (Vörner keratoderma)
10	Epidermolytic hyperkeratosis Ichthyosis with confetti Ichthyosis hystrix
11	
12	Meesmann corneal dystrophy
13	White sponge nevus
14	Epidermolysis bullosa simplex Naegeli–Franceschetti–Jadassohn syndrome Dermatopathia pigmentosa reticularis Olmsted syndrome
15	
16	Pachyonychia congenita type I
17	Pachyonychia congenita type II; Steatocystoma multiplex Vellus hair cyst
81	Monilethrix
82	Alopecia areata
83	Monilethrix
85	Pure hair–nail type of ectodermal dysplasia
86	Monilethrix

Of note, other structural proteins in the epidermis of the skin that are closely related to keratins may also cause disease if mutated. Examples include:

Cutaneous conditions caused by mutations in structural proteins within the epidermis, excluding keratin proteins
Defective protein	Conditions(s)
Loricrin	Vohwinkel syndrome (Note: Vohwinkel syndrome may be caused by mutations in either loricrin or GJB2. This is an example of locus heterogeneity.); Progressive symmetric erythrokeratodermia
Filaggrin	Ichthyosis vulgaris Atopic dermatitis

== See also ==
- List of keratins expressed in the human integumentary system
- List of cutaneous conditions caused by problems with junctional proteins
- List of target antigens in pemphigoid
- List of target antigens in pemphigus
- Cutaneous conditions with immunofluorescence findings
- List of cutaneous conditions
- List of genes mutated in cutaneous conditions
- List of histologic stains that aid in diagnosis of cutaneous conditions
- Keratoderma
