= DPR =

DPR may refer to:

== Places ==
- Democratic People's Republic of Korea (DPR of Korea), the official name of North Korea
- Donetsk People's Republic, an internationally unrecognised republic of Russia

== Government and politics ==
- California Department of Pesticide Regulation, US
- Democratic Party of Russia
- House of Representatives (Indonesia) (Dewan Perwakilan Rakyat Republik Indonesia; DPR-RI), the lower house of the Indonesian legislature
- United States District Court for the District of Puerto Rico (D.P.R.), a US federal district court
- Data Protection Registrar, the former name of the UK Information Commissioner

== Science and technology ==
- Dermatopathia pigmentosa reticularis, a congenital disorder
- Device pixel ratio, a measure of the pixel density of an electronic device

== People ==
- Ross Ulbricht (born 1984, pseudonym Dread Pirate Roberts), American who ran darknet site Silk Road
- DPR Live (born 1993), stage name of the South Korean singer Hong Da-bin

== Other uses ==
- David Price Racing, motor racing team
- Dread Pirate Roberts, the identity assumed by several fictional characters in the novel The Princess Bride (1973) and film adaptation
- DPR Construction, an American general contractor
- Detailed Project Report, in project management
