= Corneodermatoosseous syndrome =

Corneodermatoosseous syndrom
- Other names: CDO syndrome
- This condition is inherited in an autosomal dominant manner
- Specialty: Medical genetics

Corneodermatosseous syndrome is an autosomal dominant condition with onset in infancy, characterized by corneal dystrophy, photophobia, diffuse palmoplantar keratoderma, distal onycholysis, skeletal abnormalities, brachydactyly, short stature, and medullary narrowing of digits.

== See also ==
- Palmoplantar keratoderma
- Keratoderma
- Skin lesion
- Terminal osseous dysplasia with pigmentary defects
- List of cutaneous conditions
