= Levi Hawken =

New Zealand artist and skateboarder

- Born: 1975 (age 50–51); Auckland, New Zealand
- Known for: Skateboarding; Sculpture; Graffiti; "Nek minnit"
- Style: Brutalism, contemporary art
- Website: levihawken.com

Levi Hawken (born 1975) is a New Zealand sculptor, graffiti artist, and skateboarder. Hawken was a professional skateboarder for Blue Tile Lounge, Boom Skateboards, and Sector 9, and has been involved in skateboarding for over 40 years, particularly known for his hill bombing in the Auckland scene. As an artist, Hawken began graffiti street art in the mid-1990s, then worked as a graphic designer for streetwear brands in the early 2000s, before moving into concrete and glass sculpture. Hawken's experience of urban environments in his skating has influenced his work, which is characterised by a Brutalist and Modernist design language.

In 2011, Hawken was the subject of a viral Internet meme known as the "nek minnit" video, after a clip of him taken from an independent skateboarding film was uploaded to YouTube. The incident made Hawken famous in Australasia and was heavily parodied, with the phrase becoming an enduring part of New Zealand slang. However, Hawken attracted unwanted public attention and scrutiny, significantly impacting his life and career.

By the 2020s, Hawken had produced several public works including relief walls in urban Auckland and Sylvia Park, and had developed a body of exhibited work based on themes of idoltary, monuments, and the concept of futuristic hieroglyphs and artefacts. In the early 2020s, Hawken was featured as a designer with South Hill Home, a US-based luxury furnishing company.

== Early and personal life ==
Levi Hawken was born in 1975 in the eastern suburb of Glenn Innes in Auckland, New Zealand. Hawken was born with ectodermal dysplasia, a hereditary condition which affects his hair and teeth. As a result, Hawken experienced bullying as a child. His family moved to the Waitakere Ranges and then Herne Bay, where he spend his childhood. At school, he was interested in art, art history and photography.

Hawken regularly spent time skating in Melbourne from 1994–2006. He lived in Dunedin for two years in the late 2000s, but moved back to Auckland in 2011 for his work. In 2024, he was living and working in West Auckland.

In 2016, Hawken organised a memorial event on Queen Street to honour his friend and fellow skater Secombe Watene, who died suddenly of a heart attack. Around 50 skateboarders attended the event.

== Life and career ==
=== Skateboarding ===
Hawken first began skateboarding when he was seven years old. He befriended older skaters when he was 12, who helped drive him to skating spots. Hawken spent time in Aotea Square in the 1990s, and developed a reputation for hill bombing in the Auckland skateboarding community, particularly on Queen Street. Throughout his skateboarding career, hill bombs have been a particular focus of Hawken's recorded work.

Hawken skated professionally for Blue Tile Lounge in the early 1990s, and Boom Skateboards later in the decade. In the early 2000s, Hawken worked as a brand manager for the latter, and did graphic design work for the company's streetwear products, among other skateboarding brands.

In the 2010s, Hawken spent time in the United States and was part of the professional skateboarding team for Sector 9. Hawken has also designed and improved skating ramps and obstacles for skateboarders, typically as part of community events and initiatives, including in 2011 for Youth Week.

=== Artistic work ===
Hawken is a sculptor and graffiti artist, and primarily works with concrete and glass, although he has also worked with wood and bronze, and produced jewellery. Hawken began his work with graffiti in Auckland around 1993, although much of his original urban artwork has been lost.

Hawken has an interest in architecture and his work has been associated with the Brutalist and Modernist movements, and compared to aspects of expressionist Franz Marc's work and the kinetic theory of Kandinsky. He fuses contemporary design with urban aesthetics from street art, skateboarding, and concrete construction.

In a 2011 interview, Hawken stated he had lost interest in illegal outdoor graffiti and was moving towards professional studio work. However, Hawken has produced modern public displays in concrete and graffiti including in central Christchurch in 2020. Hawken has also worked with outdoor designers to enhance skateparks and inner-city areas with murals and relief walls, including concrete work at Jack Pringle Skate Park.

Hawken has produced several collections that are based on themes of idoltary, monuments, and the concept of futuristic hieroglyphs and artefacts. Some of Hawken's works have appeared publicly on benches and concrete walls, such as Horus 3 in City Mall, Auckland, and a relief wall in Sylvia Park. In the 2020s, Hawken was a featured designer with South Hill Home.

=== Viral meme ===
In 2011, Hawken became famous in a viral Internet meme known as "nek minnit". The short clip shows Hawken at a Fairfield skatepark next to a broken scooter, in which he jokes: "Left my scooter outside the dairy; nek minnit ...". The nine-second-long clip was recorded for South in Your Mouth, an independent skate film by Colin Evans, Hawken's friend. However, the "nek minute" video was uploaded separately.

The phrase "nek minute" was the sixth most searched term in New Zealand on Google in 2011 and had around 1.6 million views by December. It was voted runner-up in the 2011 "Word of the Year" poll by the website Public Address. By February 2025, the original upload had been viewed over 8 million times.

Hawken has mixed feelings about the video and its popularity, which profoundly changed his life. He stated that for several years, members of the public would shout the phrase at him, an experience which left him feeling "freaked out." Some online commenters mocked his appearance, unaware of his ectodermal dysplasia, leaving Hawken feeling his professional reputation of two decades had been negatively affected. However, Hawken has also embraced the positive sides of the incident, using the fame and the meme to appear in a drink-driving PSA, a Pink Shirt Day campaign, and working with youth groups, among other opportunities. In 2019, Hawken's experience was the subject of the short documentary MEME Me by Loading Docs.

Hawken successfully acquired the trademark to "nek minnit" in New Zealand after an unrelated company attempted to register it. Hawken claimed he did not wish to profit from the trademark, but was concerned his image and professional reputation would be associated with projects he had nothing to do with, and wanted to "protect" himself.

== Selected works ==
- Wilful Damage (c. 2011), a six-piece exhibition, acrylic on canvas, an ode to Hawken's lost graffiti art
- Concrete Half Pipe Relief (c. 2020) at Jack Pringle Skatepark in collaboration with Richard Smith, an adaption of the 2010 exhibition Secret Gutter Expose
- Love is a Relief (c. 2023), a concrete tile wall in Sylvia Park
- False Idol series (c. 2023), a collection of concrete and glass sculptures and jewellery
