= Loricrin =

Protein found in humans

LORICRIN

Identifiers
- Aliases: LORICRIN, loricrin, LOR, loricrin cornified envelope precursor protein
- External IDs: OMIM: 152445; GeneCards: LORICRIN

Gene location (Human)
Chr.	Chromosome 1 (human)
Band	1q21.3	Start	153,259,687 bp
Band	1q21.3	End	153,262,124 bp
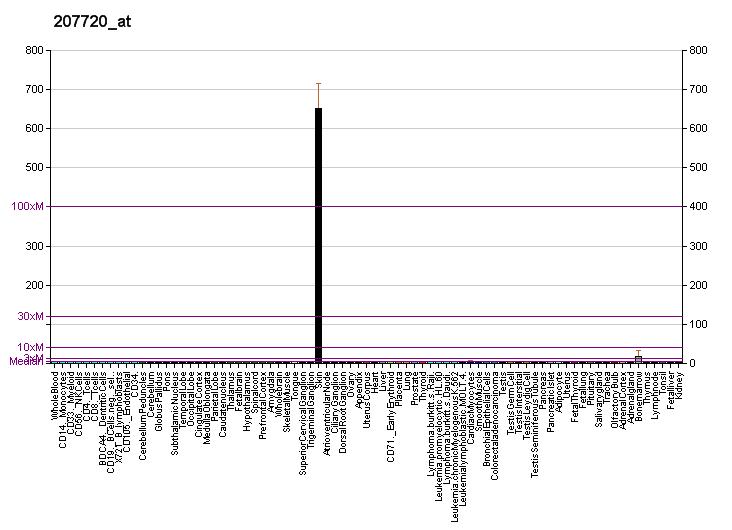
RNA expression pattern
Bgee	Human / Mouse (ortholog); Top expressed in: skin of arm; skin of thigh; nipple; vulva; human penis; skin of hip; skin of abdomen; gums; gingival epithelium; amniotic fluid / n/a; More reference expression data
BioGPS	More reference expression data
Gene ontology
Molecular function	protein-macromolecule adaptor activity; structural constituent of cytoskeleton; protein binding; structural molecule activity; structural constituent of skin epidermis
Cellular component	cytoplasm; nucleoplasm; nucleus; cornified envelope; cytosol
Biological process	peptide cross-linking; keratinization; keratinocyte differentiation; cytoskeleton organization; cornification
Sources:Amigo / QuickGO
Orthologs
Databases	NCBI: entry; OMA: entry
Species	Human	Mouse
Entrez	4014	n/a
Ensembl	ENSG00000203782	n/a
UniProt	P23490	n/a
RefSeq (mRNA)	NM_000427	n/a
RefSeq (protein)	NP_000418	n/a
Location (UCSC)	Chr 1: 153.26 – 153.26 Mb	n/a
PubMed search		n/a
- Wikidata
View/Edit Human

Loricrin is a protein that in humans is encoded by the LOR gene.

== Function ==
Loricrin is a major protein component of the cornified cell envelope found in terminally differentiated epidermal cells.

Loricrin is expressed in the granular layer of all keratinized epithelial cells of mammals tested including oral, esophageal and stomach mucosa of rodents, tracheal squamous metaplasia of vitamin A deficient hamster and estrogen induced squamous vaginal epithelium of rats.

== Clinical significance ==
Mutations in the LOR gene are associated with Vohwinkel's syndrome and Camisa disease, both inherited skin diseases.

== See also ==
- List of cutaneous conditions caused by mutations in keratins
