= Progressive symmetric erythrokeratodermia =

Rare, genetic skin condition

- Other names: Erythrokeratodermia progressiva symmetrica

Progressive symmetric erythrokeratodermia is a rare, autosomal dominant skin condition that manifests soon after birth with erythematous, hyperkeratotic plaques that are symmetrically distributed on the extremities, buttocks, and face, but sparing the trunk. No other clinical symptoms nor mental or physical signs are usually associated with the condition.

This condition is also known as Darier-Gottron syndrome, progressive symmetric erythrokeratoderma, progressive symmetric erythrokeratodermia of Gottron and erythrokeratodermia variabilis et progressiva.

Less than one hundred cases have been reported to date.

== Genetics ==
A mutation in the KDSR gene has been reported to be associated with this condition. This gene encodes 3-ketodihydrosphingosine reductase, an enzyme in the ceramide synthesis pathway. The authors also reported that the use of systemic isotretinoin resulted in almost complete resolution of the lesions in two cases.

Two other reports suggest that isotretinoin may be of use.

== Mechanism ==
Skin plaques start to appear as reddened areas of inflammation, thus often leading to the mistaken diagnosis of Atopic Dermatitis. Following inflammation, the red areas start keratinization, eventually forming the definitive plaques that appear brownish, dry and scaled. Following quite a precise temporal pattern of evolution, the keratinized plaques last for weeks or months, eventually leading to periods of desquamation that leads to the uncovering of "normal" skin. Then, a new cycle usually begins, leaving a variable number of days of delay between the cycles.

Though environmental causes are not well understood, it seems clear that factors like sun exposure, wind and air conditioning add to the degree of skin inflammation that sets the start of a new cycle.

== Diagnosis ==
=== Differential diagnosis ===
This includes erythrokeratodermia variabilis and loricrin keratoderma

== Treatment ==
Definitive treatment does not exist at the moment. Palliative treatment are intended to alleviate the itching that often accompanies the skin inflammation and to moisture the dry skin to prevent excessive dryness and scaling of the plaques.

== History ==
This condition was described by Darier in 1911. It was given its present name by Grotton in 1923.

== See also ==
- Skin lesion
- List of cutaneous conditions
- List of cutaneous conditions caused by mutations in keratins
