= Camisa disease =

- Other names: Vohwinkel variant with ichthyosis
- This condition is inherited in an autosomal dominant manner
- Specialty: Dermatology

Camisa disease is the variant form of Vohwinkel syndrome, characterized by ichthyosis and normal hearing.

It is associated with loricrin.

It was characterized in 1984 and 1988.

== See also ==
- Palmoplantar keratoderma
- Keratoderma
- List of cutaneous conditions
