= Hypotrichosis–lymphedema–telangiectasia syndrome =

- Other names: Hypotrichosis-lymphedema-telangiectasia-membranoproliferative glomerulonephritis syndrome
- Specialty: Medical genetics

Hypotrichosis–lymphedema–telangiectasia syndrome is a congenital syndrome characterized by lymphedema (swelling of tissue due to malformation or malfunction of lymphatics), the presence of telegiectasias (small dilated vessels near the surface of the skin), and hypotrichosis or alopecia (hair loss). Lymphedema usually develops in the lower extremities during puberty. Hair is normal at birth, but usually lost during infancy. Telangiectasias may present on the palms and soles more commonly than on the scalp, legs, and genitalia. The syndrome has been reported in association with both autosomal dominant and autosomal recessive inheritance patterns.

It is associated with a rare mutation of the transcription factor gene SOX18.

== See also ==
- HOPP syndrome
- List of cutaneous conditions
