= Normophosphatemic familial tumoral calcinosis =

- Specialty: Dermatology

Normophosphatemic familial tumoral calcinosis is a cutaneous disorder characterized by cutaneous calcification or ossification.

== See also ==
- Progressive systemic sclerosis
- List of cutaneous conditions
- List of genes mutated in cutaneous conditions
