= Plate-like osteoma cutis =

- Specialty: Dermatology

Plate-like osteoma cutis is a congenital condition characterized by firm papules and nodules on the skin.

== See also ==
- List of cutaneous conditions
- List of genes mutated in cutaneous conditions
