= Terminal osseous dysplasia with pigmentary defects =

- This condition is inherited in an X-linked dominant manner.
- Specialty: Dermatology

Terminal osseous dysplasia with pigmentary defects is a cutaneous condition characterized by hyperpigmented, atrophic facial macules.

It has been associated with FLNA.

== See also ==
- Corneodermatosseous syndrome
- Osseous choristoma of the tongue
- List of cutaneous conditions
