= Paraneoplastic keratoderma =

- Specialty: Dermatology

Paraneoplastic keratoderma is a cutaneous condition characterized by a hornlike skin texture associated with an internal malignancy.

== See also ==
- Keratoderma
- List of cutaneous conditions
