= CoryxKenshin =

American YouTuber (born 1992)

- Williams in 2026
- Born: Cory DeVante Williams; November 9, 1992 (age 34); Detroit, Michigan, U.S.
- Other names: Kenshin; The Shogun; The Ankle Breaker; The Chosen
- Education: Willow Run High School Michigan State University University of Michigan
- Occupations: YouTuber; writer; actor

YouTube information
- Channel: CoryxKenshin
- Years active: 2009–present (hiatus, 2023–24)
- Genres: Comedy; Let's Play
- Subscribers: 24.7 million
- Views: 10.0 billion
- Last updated: August 23, 2026
- Website: Official website

Cory DeVante Williams (born November 9, 1992), known online as CoryxKenshin, (Note: Chiefly pronounced as "Cory Kenshin" but sometimes pronounced with the "X") is an American YouTuber, writer and actor. Williams joined YouTube in 2009. Known for his comedic playthroughs of horror games, Cory was ranked the fourth top creator in the United States in 2021 and has amassed a huge following of a group on social media known as "the Samurai".

== Early life ==
Cory DeVante Williams was born on November 9, 1992, in Detroit, Michigan. He was born with ectodermal dysplasia, a rare genetic disorder that caused him to lack a full set of teeth, and diminished hair growth on his arms and legs.

In August 2010, Williams began attending Michigan State University after being rejected from his dream school, the University of Michigan. Williams attended Michigan State for his freshman and sophomore years, majoring in media arts, and despite having exceptional grades and many friends, he still aspired to attend the University of Michigan. Williams was eventually convinced by his father to apply for a transfer to Michigan, and was accepted in 2012. Due to changing his major to computer science, Williams' previous two years at MSU were null, and he had to start back as a freshman. In April 2015, near the end of his junior year, Williams made the "super tough" decision to take a break from university for one year to focus solely on YouTube. He moved out of his dorm on May 1, 2015, and decided to give his channel until May 1, 2016, to become a viable source of income; if it did not, he would return to Michigan to finish his degree.

== Internet career ==
Williams began uploading videos to YouTube in 2009. Although he originally created comedy sketches, Williams began to play popular horror games such as Five Nights at Freddy's (2014) and Bloodborne (2015) instead, along with creating the "Spooky Scary Sunday" horror short film reaction series. He also played video games of other genres and AAA games such as Elden Ring (2022). His video of the rhythm game Friday Night Funkin' (2020) became the fifth most-viewed video in the United States in 2021. IGN Africa described the video as "part music video, part playthrough" and praised Williams' use of comedy in the video. Besides his let's plays, Williams is known for his humor and energetic, light-hearted personality.

Williams was ranked the fourth top creator in the United States in 2021 by subscriber growth (Note: The number of subscribers the creator gained throughout the year; in-country.) and many of his videos have stayed on the YouTube trending tab for several days. He has also been noted for frequently taking hiatuses from uploading videos, ranging from several days to months. In 2018, he took a four-month break from YouTube; in 2019, Williams uploaded a video discussing his struggles with mental health due to the pressures of content creation, which was cited in an article from The Verge in the wake of YouTuber Etika's death.

On December 13, 2024, Williams posted a video on his channel, after a 17-month hiatus, in which he announced his original manga series which he wrote, titled Monsters We Make. Two days later, on December 15, his channel also reached 20 million subscribers.

=== "YouTube: Racism and Favoritism" ===
External video
- YouTube: Racism and Favoritism; The video uploaded to Williams' YouTube channel on August 24, 2022.

On August 24, 2022, Williams uploaded a video onto his channel alleging that "racism and favoritism" may influence YouTube's review process. In the video, he recounted an incident where a reviewer age-restricted his video of the horror game The Mortuary Assistant, thereby lessening his visibility and monetization. As many other videos featuring the same content were not subject to the same restrictions, Williams became confused and submitted an appeal, which was rejected. He sent a clip of an even more popular YouTuber, Markiplier, playing the same game to his partner program representative. Although he expected them to restrict Markiplier's video, YouTube instead unrestricted Williams' video.

Confused over the sudden reversal, Williams again contacted his representative, who inquired to the policy team. The company then restricted every video on the platform of The Mortuary Assistant. This led Williams to conclude that the company's favoritism of larger creators—or even, possibly, racism—were factors in the reviewers' decisions, though he was unsure if an automated or human reviewer restricted his video in the first place.

Numerous other YouTubers, including Jacksepticeye, Ludwig, GothamChess, Philip DeFranco, berleezy, Deestroying, and MoistCr1tikal voiced their support online. The video later peaked at No. 1 on the trending tab.

== Personal life ==
According to Distractify, Williams resides in Farmington Hills, Michigan. He is a devout Christian.

In 2020, Williams stopped uploading YouTube videos temporarily as a result of anxiety, burnout and depression. He described 2020 as "the worst year of [his] life", citing major events such as the COVID-19 pandemic and the murder of George Floyd.

== Filmography ==
=== Film ===
Year	Title	Role	Refs.
2023	Five Nights at Freddy's	Cabbie	
2025	Five Nights at Freddy's 2	Cabbie	

=== Television ===
Year	Title	Channel	Refs.
2019–2020	Player Select	Disney XD	

== Bibliography ==
Year	Title	Publisher
2024–present	Monsters We Make	New Edyn Press IDW Publishing
