= Albert Touraine =

French dermatologist

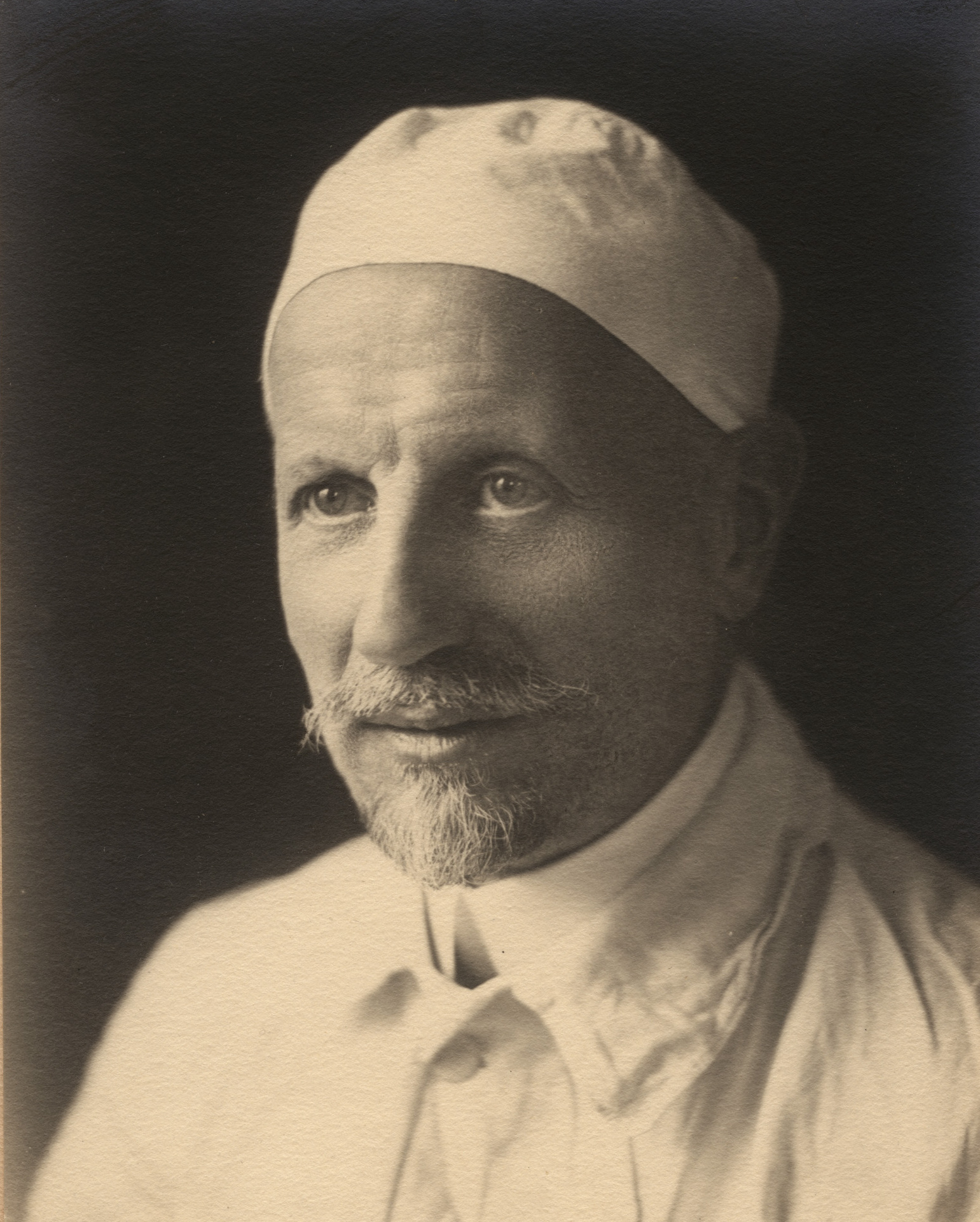
- Born: November 11, 1883; Paris, France
- Died: May 3, 1961 (aged 77)
- Education: University of Paris
- Medical career
- Profession: Physician
- Field: Dermatologist

Albert Touraine (11 November 1883 – 3 May 1961) was a French dermatologist.

He studied medicine at the University of Paris as a pupil of Eugène Apert and Émile Achard. In 1912 he received his doctorate with the thesis Les anticorps syphilitiques : essais de séro-agglutination de la syphilis. In 1932 he was named senior physician at the Hôpital Saint-Louis.

Hypohidrotic ectodermal dysplasia (or "Christ-Siemens-Touraine syndrome") is named for him. Touraine-Solente-Gole syndrome is also named for him.

For eighteen years he was editor of the journal Annales de dermatologie et de syphiligraphie. In 1945 he was elected as a member of the Académie de médecine.
