= Drug-induced keratoderma =

- Specialty: Dermatology

Drug-induced keratoderma is a cutaneous condition characterized by a hornlike skin texture.

== See also ==
- Keratoderma
- List of cutaneous conditions
