= Bart syndrome =

- Specialty: Dermatology

Bart syndrome, also known as aplasia cutis congenita type VI, is a rare genetic disorder characterized by the association of congenital localized absence of skin, mucocutaneous blistering and absent and dystrophic nails.

== Causes ==
Blistering in Bart syndrome represents a form of epidermolysis bullosa caused by ultrastructural abnormalities in the anchoring fibrils. Genetic linkage of the inheritance of the disease points to the region of chromosome 3 near the collagen, type VII, alpha 1 gene (COL7A1).

== See also ==
- List of cutaneous conditions
- Bart-Pumphrey syndrome
