= Hypotrichosis–acro-osteolysis–onychogryphosis–palmoplantar keratoderma–periodontitis syndrome =

- Specialty: Dermatology

Hypotrichosis–acro-osteolysis–onychogryphosis–palmoplantar keratoderma–periodontitis syndrome (also known as "HOPP syndrome") is a cutaneous condition characterized by a prominent palmoplantar keratoderma.

== See also ==
- Hereditary sclerosing poikiloderma
- List of cutaneous conditions
