= Monsters We Make =

Manga series by CoryxKenshin

- Volume 1 cover, featuring Jabari Booker
- Genre: Sci-fi; Action
- Author: CoryxKenshin
- Publisher: New Edyn Press; IDW Publishing (retail edition)
- Original run: December 16, 2024 – present
- Volumes: 4

Monsters We Make (Note: Japanese: MONSTERS WE MAKE(私たちが作るモンスター)) is an original English-language manga series created by American YouTuber CoryxKenshin. It is published by New Edyn Press and IDW Publishing and the first volume was released on December 16, 2024. The story is set in the year 2114 and follows Jabari Booker, a young music prodigy who joins a school called New Edyn Academy to grow his talent, but things take a dark turn. He gets caught up in a conspiracy that includes dangerous mutant creatures and a shady tech company.

== Production ==
=== Development ===
The project was first revealed following CoryxKenshin's return from a year-and-a-half hiatus with an animated trailer, explaining that his lengthy absence was due to a new project he'd been working on that entire time. A website then introduced fans to the main cast of characters. CoryxKenshin said the manga is a "playground" for his ideas. He was inspired by anime like Dragon Ball Z, Attack on Titan, and characters like The Raikage from Naruto. Through Jabari, he wants readers to see a powerful Black hero-someone who could inspire others just like Goku inspired him growing up. The first volume is co-created by Corey Mikell, with principal art by Andrew Gong and art by Elyas Magee-Shamaan.

== Story ==
In the year 2114, the world hides its darkest secrets behind the glow of neon.

Jabari Booker, a 17-year-old gifted musician, enters New Edyn Academy expecting to refine his talents. Instead, he’s plunged into a waking nightmare.The academy, a supposed sanctuary for students born during The Eternal Night, is training its students for a more sinister purpose—killing monsters. Citizens, including his classmates, are mutating into vicious creatures, twisted by the dark secrets of SANADA, a global tech giant pulling the strings.

Jabari and his newfound allies are thrust into the ranks of expendable soldiers known as HOUNDS. Together, they must endure a brutal monster onslaught, expose SANADA’s hidden agenda, and confront the darkness within themselves.

As the line between human and monster blurs, one question haunts them: Who are the real monsters?

== Volumes ==
The Volumes have been self-published both digitally and physically through the manga's official website since December 2024. In August 2025 it was announced that IDW Publishing would begin publishing a new edition of the manga starting in October 2025 for retail stores as well.

=== Volumes ===
No.	Title	Release date	ISBN
1	Volume 1	December 16, 2024; October 28, 2025 (IDW edition)	979-8-99-217111-2; 979-8-99-217114-3 (IDW edition)
Chapter 1: "Enter The New Mid-Year"; Chapter 2: "The Great Halls of New Edyn"; Chapter 3: "The Aptitude Test"; Chapter 4: "Truth vs. Escape"; Chapter 5: "Sound Barrier"; Chapter 6: "Follow The Leader"; Chapter 7: "As Above, So Below"; Chapter 8: "First Day Kill"
This first volume was dedicated to Akira Toriyama, creator of Dragon Ball Z, who passed away in March 2024.
2	Volume 2	August 11, 2025; May 26, 2026 (IDW edition)	979-8-99-217112-9; 979-8-99-217117-4 (IDW edition)
Chapter 9: "17 Years Ago, Part 1"; Chapter 10: "S.I.C."; Chapter 11: "Meet Vector One"; Chapter 12: "Deployment Complete"; Chapter 13: "Hounds of the Hill: Han vs. Wraith!"; Chapter 14: "Make Like a Tree"; Chapter 15: "Tuning Crash Course”; Chapter 16: "Jabari's Dream”; Chapter 17: “Showdown! Jabari vs. Fayne”
3	Volume 3	December 9, 2025; October 20, 2026 (IDW edition)	979-8-99-217115-0; 979-8-99-217119-8 (IDW edition)
Chapter 18: "17 Years Ago, Part 2"; Chapter 19: "Oh Captain, My Captain"; Chapter 20: "Pack of Lies"; Chapter 21: "Knight of Edyn: Part I"; Chapter 22: "Knight of Edyn: Part II"; Chapter 23: "Knight of Edyn: Part III"; Chapter 24: "Knight of Edyn: Part IV"; Chapter 25: "Knight of Edyn: Part V"
4	Volume 4	July 2026	—
Chapter 26: "17 Years Ago, Part 3"; Chapter 27: "Retro Luv"; Chapter 28: “New Game"; Chapter 29: “First Night at Hal’s, Part 1”; Chapter 30: “First Night at Hal’s, Part 2”; Chapter 31: “SkullCrusher Z, Part 1”; Chapter 32: "SkullCrusher Z, Part 2"

== Reception ==
The first volume sold 200,000 copies in its first week, making it one of the fastest-selling independently published manga series in the United States.
