= Multiple minute digitate hyperkeratosis =

- Specialty: Dermatology

Multiple minute digitate hyperkeratosis, also known as digitate keratoses, disseminated spiked hyperkeratosis, familial disseminated piliform hyperkeratosis, and minute aggregate keratosis is a rare cutaneous condition, with about half of cases being familial, inherited in an autosomal dominant fashion, while the other half are sporadic.

== Signs and symptoms ==
Multiple minute digitate hyperkeratosis is mostly a nonfollicular digitate keratosis that affects the limbs and trunk. There is no impact on the face or palmoplantar surfaces. The lesions consist of skin-colored, yellow, brown, or white spicules that range in length from 0.5 to 5.0 mm and diameter from 0.3 to 3.0 mm. Occasionally, flat-topped, dome-shaped, or crateriform papules are also present.

== Causes ==
Multiple minute digitate hyperkeratosis may be sporadic or familial.

== Diagnosis ==
Histopathology reveals a stratum granulosum with varying thickness and localized orthokeratotic hyperkeratosis originating from a tented epidermis. Rarely, there have also been reports of superficial cutaneous lymphoplasmocytic infiltrates, parakeratosis, and epidermal invagination. A recurring characteristic that unites all of the cases that have been documented is the absence of follicular involvement.

Reduced keratohyaline granules with varying numbers of Odland bodies are seen under electron microscopy.

== Treatment ==
While improvements with various topical keratolytics and topical and oral retinoids have been reported, treatment is frequently ineffective or only temporary.

== See also ==
- Epidermis
- Skin lesion
