= Keratoderma =

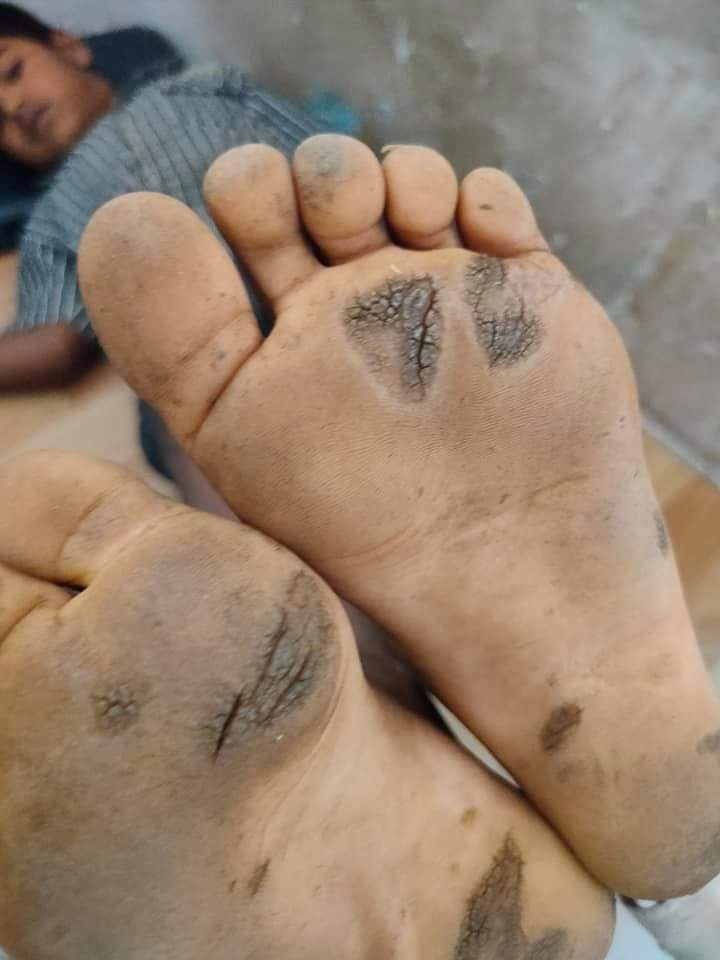
- Diffuse keratodermas affect most of the palms and soles.
- Specialty: Dermatology

Keratoderma is a local or general thickening of the horny layer of the epidermis.

== Classification ==
The keratodermas are classified into the following subgroups:

=== Congenital ===
- Simple keratodermas
  - Diffuse palmoplantar keratodermas
    - Diffuse epidermolytic palmoplantar keratoderma
    - Diffuse nonepidermolytic palmoplantar keratoderma
    - mal de Meleda
  - Focal palmoplantar keratoderma
    - Striate palmoplantar keratoderma
  - Punctate palmoplantar keratoderma
    - Keratosis punctata palmaris et plantaris
    - Spiny keratoderma
    - Focal acral hyperkeratosis
- Complex keratodermas
  - Diffuse palmoplantar keratoderma
    - Erythrokeratodermia variabilis
    - Palmoplantar keratoderma of Sybert
    - Olmsted syndrome
    - Naegeli–Franceschetti–Jadassohn syndrome
  - Focal palmoplantar keratoderma
    - Papillon–Lefèvre syndrome
    - Pachyonychia congenita type I
    - Pachyonychia congenita type II
    - Focal palmoplantar keratoderma with oral mucosal hyperkeratosis
    - Camisa disease
  - Ectodermal dysplasias
    - Clouston's hidrotic ectodermal dysplasia
    - Acrokeratotic poikiloderma
    - Dermatopathic pigmentosa reticularis
  - Syndromic keratodermas
    - Vohwinkel syndrome
    - Palmoplantar keratoderma associated with esophageal cancer
    - Palmoplantar keratoderma and spastic paraplegia
    - Naxos disease
    - Striate palmoplantar keratoderma, woolly hair, and left ventricular dilated cardiomyopathy
    - Keratitis-ichthyosis-deafness syndrome
    - Corneodermatosseous syndrome
    - Huriez syndrome
    - Oculocutaneous tyrosinemia
    - Cardiofaciocutaneous syndrome
    - Schöpf–Schulz–Passarge syndrome

=== Acquired ===
- Acquired keratodermas
  - AIDS-associated keratoderma
  - Arsenical keratoses
  - Calluses
  - Climacteric keratoderma
  - Clavi (Corns)
  - Eczema
  - Human papillomavirus
  - Keratoderma blenorrhagicum
  - Lichen planus
  - Norwegian scabies
  - Paraneoplastic keratoderma
  - Psoriasis
  - Reactive arthritis
  - Secondary syphilis
  - Tinea pedis
  - Sézary syndrome
  - Tuberculosis verrucosa cutis
  - Drug-induced keratoderma

== See also ==
- Palmoplantar keratoderma
- List of cutaneous conditions
