= Sector 9 =

American skateboard manufacturer

- Industry: Longboard (skateboard) manufacturer
- Founded: 1993
- Founder: Steve Lake; Dave Klimkiewicz; Dennis Telfer; Tal O'Farrell
- Headquarters: San Diego, California, US
- Parent: Back Nine Industries
- Website: www.sector9.com

Sector 9 is a longboard manufacturing company started in La Jolla, California, a community in San Diego, in 1993 by co-founders, Steve Lake, Dave Klimkiewicz, Dennis Telfer, and Tal O'Farrell. Sector 9 is currently headquartered in San Diego.

Sector 9 manufactures skateboarding equipment and surf/skate lifestyle apparel. Their main focus is on hard goods, but they also offer a range of soft goods. Throughout their history, they have catered to both entry level skaters with more cruiser oriented boards, as well as high performance downhill skateboarding goods that have been used by professional riders. The graphics and art are created by a global team, including Travis Schmidt, Rüdiger Monroy Duarte, and Jeff Sebastian.

Sector 9 works with numerous distributors for its products, including Eastern Skateboard Supply and South Shore Distribution.

Billabong International acquired Sector 9 in 2008. On June 28, 2016, it was announced that Bravo Corp had in turn purchased the company from Billabong for $12 million.

Sector 9 sponsors numerous different athletes in skateboarding and surfing, including Joel Tudor and Levi Hawken.
