= Naegeli–Franceschetti–Jadassohn syndrome =

- Other names: Chromatophore nevus of Naegeli
- Naegeli–Franceschetti–Jadassohn syndrome has an autosomal dominant pattern of inheritance
- Frequency: 0.0001%

Naegeli–Franceschetti–Jadassohn syndrome (NFJS), also known as chromatophore nevus of Naegeli and Naegeli syndrome, is a rare autosomal dominant form of ectodermal dysplasia, characterized by reticular skin pigmentation, diminished function of the sweat glands, the absence of teeth and hyperkeratosis of the palms and soles. One of the most striking features is the absence of fingerprint lines on the fingers.

Naegeli syndrome is similar to dermatopathia pigmentosa reticularis, both of which are caused by a specific defect in the keratin 14 protein.

== Cause ==
NFJS is caused by mutations in the keratin 14 (KRT14) gene, located on chromosome 17q12-21. The disorder is inherited in an autosomal dominant manner, which means that the defective gene responsible for a disorder is located on an autosome (chromosome 17 is an autosome), and only one copy of the defective gene is sufficient to cause the disorder, when inherited from a parent who has the disorder.

== Diagnosis ==
In most cases of Naegeli syndrome, a diagnosis is made based on the typical clinical features of this condition. The diagnosis may be confirmed by genetic testing of the KRT14 gene.

== Treatment ==
Treatment for Naegeli syndrome is based on an individual's symptoms. Dry skin can be moisturized with creams. Exposure to heat should be limited. To avoid overheating, affected individuals should stay hydrated, wear appropriate clothing, and use wet dressings. Dental care is needed to treat cavities and tooth loss.

== Eponym ==
It was named after Oskar Nägeli, Adolphe Franceschetti, and Josef Jadassohn.

== See also ==
- List of cutaneous conditions
- List of cutaneous conditions caused by mutations in keratins
