= Dermatopathia pigmentosa reticularis =

- Other names: Dermatopathic pigmentosa reticularis
- Dermatopathia pigmentosa reticularis has an autosomal dominant pattern of inheritance
- Specialty: Medical genetics

Dermatopathia pigmentosa reticularis (DPR) is a rare, autosomal dominant congenital disorder that is a form of ectodermal dysplasia. Dermatopathia pigmentosa reticularis is composed of the triad of generalized reticulate hyperpigmentation, noncicatricial alopecia, and onychodystrophy. DPR is a non life-threatening disease that largely affects the skin, hair, and nails. It has also been identified as a keratin disorder. Historically, as of 1992, only 10 cases had been described in world literature; however, due to recent advances in genetic analysis, five additional families studied in 2006 have been added to the short list of confirmed cases.

== Signs and symptoms ==
Symptoms include lack of sweat glands, thin hair, brittle nails, mottled skin, and lack of fingerprints. It is also characterized by a widespread, early-onset reticulate hyperpigmentation. Those affected may also have adermatoglyphia, abnormal epithelial differentiation, palmoplantar hyperkeratosis of the palms and soles, acral dorsal blistering, as well as hypohidrosis or hyperhidrosis.

DPR is very similar to the related Naegeli-Franceschetti-Jadassohn syndrome (NFJS). Both cause an affected person to lack fingerprints, as well as present a lace-like pattern of hyperpigmentation and hyperkeratosis of the palms of the hands and soles of the feet. DPR is distinguished from NFJS by the duration of hyperpigmentation and lack of dental abnormalities. Since these differences are very slight and relatively minimal, researchers recommend that NFJS and DPR be considered a single disorder.

== Causes ==
The disease interval for DPR was found to harbor 230 genes associated with the condition. DPR and NFJS syndromes were specifically found to be differentiated from other syndromes by a mutation of the keratin 14 gene, located on chromosome 17q21.2. This was found when keratin genes KRT14, KRT16, and KRT17 were reassessed in 2006, revealing pathogenic mutations of KRT14 in all patients with NFJS/DPR, displaying a strong correlation and suggesting a potential causation. The type of mutations observed were heterozygous nonsense or frameshift mutations, meaning the function of the gene was completely disrupted (missense is correlated with EBS). The different phenotypic presentations of recessive (EBS-causing) versus dominant (NFJS/DPR-causing) premature truncation mutations in KRT14 are still unclear. The NFJS/DPR mutations were verified using two screening approaches, in which it was found that 17delG was absent from a panel of 100 control individuals, and C18X and Q7X were found to create a novel recognition site for the endonucleases DdeI and BfaI. Because the mutations were found to be heterozygous, the condition was concluded to be autosomal dominant in its inheritance pattern.

A study conducted on five families using a two-point linkage analysis of the combined genotyping data for three families across the NFJS/DPR candidate region generated an LOD score of 6.2 at marker D17S800, with a recombination score of 0. Further analysis revealed that NFJS may be caused by an identical founder mutation located within a 6-Mb interval between D17S946 and D17S2180.

The disruption of the KRT14 gene in DPR suggests this gene is important during the early development of dermatoglyphics and sweat glands. Because of the aforementioned genetic similarity between NFJS and DPR, some researchers have suggested treating the disorders as a single condition.

== Diagnosis ==
Diagnosis of DPR begins with review of a patient's medical history, laboratory results, and clinical examination of symptoms. Biopsy and histopathological examination can be used to test for the presence of hyperkeratosis, parakeratosis, follicular plugging, and basal cell melanization, all indicators of DPR. Furthermore, abnormalities in skin pigmentation patterns as well as the presence of palmoplantar keratoderma with yellow tinting of the skin can indicate a possible case of DPR. Despite the presence of outward indicators, routine blood testing will not yield abnormal results. While the aforementioned symptoms of DPR are outwardly identifiable, DPR is a rare genetic disease that requires genetic analysis to yield a confirmed diagnosis.

The Genetic Testing Registry lists 15 clinical genetic tests used in obtaining a diagnosis of this disorder. Two of these tests utilize Targeted Variant Analysis, thirteen utilize sequence analysis of the entire coding region, and seven utilize deletion and duplication analysis. The type of test ordered may depend on the clinician's judgement or access to specific testing methods.

== Management ==
To date, there is no medical treatment specific to DPR; however, symptom management of palmoplantar hyperkeratosis as well as other, secondary symptoms is possible through the use of topical steroids, keratolytics, and emollients. Furthermore, cold compresses can be used to treat blistering.

== Epidemiology ==
Since first being reported, only 12 cases of DPR have been described and diagnosed. Many studies and diagnoses have come from the same family, but a single case report was found in India. In a study conducted by Lugassy et al., the five families being studied were from geographically different places: one family, for example was Swiss, another was from the United States, and a third was from the United Kingdom.

== See also ==
- List of cutaneous conditions caused by mutations in keratins
