= WNT10B =

Protein-coding gene in the species Homo sapiens

Identifiers
- Aliases: WNT10B, SHFM6, WNT-12, Wnt family member 10B, STHAG8
- External IDs: OMIM: 601906; MGI: 108061; GeneCards: WNT10B

Gene location (Human)
Chr.	Chromosome 12 (human)
Band	12q13.12	Start	48,965,340 bp
Band	12q13.12	End	48,971,735 bp

Gene location (Mouse)
Chr.	Chromosome 15 (mouse)
Band	15 F1|15 54.65 cM	Start	98,668,593 bp
Band	15 F1|15 54.65 cM	End	98,676,031 bp
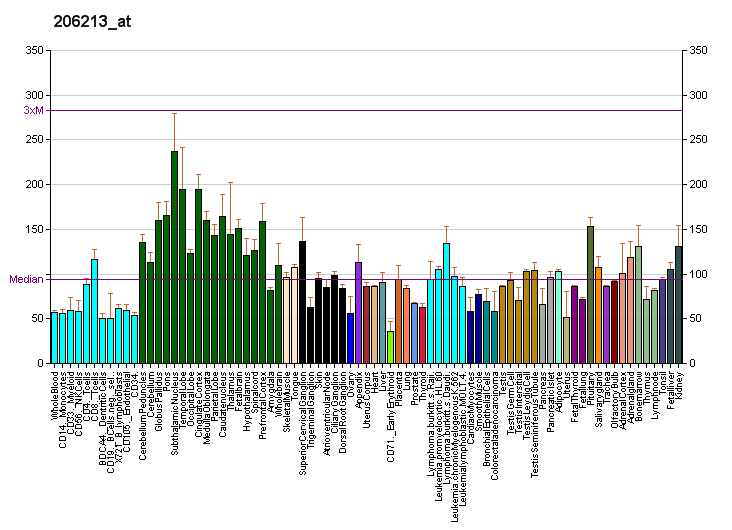
RNA expression pattern
Bgee	Human / Mouse (ortholog); Top expressed in: orbitofrontal cortex; nucleus accumbens; Brodmann area 10; Region I of hippocampus proper; cingulate gyrus; anterior cingulate cortex; Brodmann area 46; right frontal lobe; dorsolateral prefrontal cortex; entorhinal cortex / Top expressed in: prostatic epithelium; surface ectoderm; inner root sheath; enamel knot; hair; skin of finger; lip; inner cell mass; morula; pretectal area; More reference expression data
BioGPS	More reference expression data
Gene ontology
Molecular function	receptor ligand activity; frizzled binding; signaling receptor binding
Cellular component	extracellular region; extracellular space
Biological process	cellular response to organic substance; myoblast differentiation involved in skeletal muscle regeneration; cellular response to retinoic acid; cell fate commitment; negative regulation of fat cell differentiation; positive regulation of RNA polymerase II transcription preinitiation complex assembly; chondrocyte differentiation; positive regulation of bone mineralization; lipid metabolism; positive regulation of canonical Wnt signaling pathway; regulation of transcription by RNA polymerase II; hematopoietic stem cell proliferation; cellular response to organic cyclic compound; protein stabilization; positive regulation of DNA-binding transcription factor activity; positive regulation of ossification; negative regulation of transcription by RNA polymerase II; bone trabecula formation; positive regulation of timing of anagen; regulation of fat cell differentiation; multicellular organism development; positive regulation of epithelial cell differentiation; positive regulation of osteoblast differentiation; fungiform papilla development; skeletal muscle tissue regeneration; G2/M transition of mitotic cell cycle; skeletal muscle fiber development; neuron differentiation; positive regulation of cell population proliferation; negative regulation of epithelial cell proliferation; positive regulation of apoptotic process; regulation of proteasomal ubiquitin-dependent protein catabolic process; canonical Wnt signaling pathway; regulation of skeletal muscle tissue development; positive regulation of G2/M transition of mitotic cell cycle; smoothened signaling pathway; cellular response to parathyroid hormone stimulus; regulation of protein metabolic process; sensory perception of taste; cellular response to cAMP; positive regulation of transcription by RNA polymerase II; Wnt signaling pathway; regulation of signaling receptor activity; negative regulation of cold-induced thermogenesis
Sources:Amigo / QuickGO
Orthologs
Databases	NCBI: entry; OMA: entry
Species	Human	Mouse
Entrez	7480	22410
Ensembl	ENSG00000169884	ENSMUSG00000022996
UniProt	O00744	P48614
RefSeq (mRNA)	NM_003394	NM_011718
RefSeq (protein)	NP_003385	NP_035848
Location (UCSC)	Chr 12: 48.97 – 48.97 Mb	Chr 15: 98.67 – 98.68 Mb
PubMed search
- Wikidata
View/Edit Human	View/Edit Mouse

Protein Wnt-10b (formerly Wnt12) is a protein that in humans is encoded by the WNT10B gene.

The WNT gene family consists of structurally related genes that encode secreted signaling proteins. These proteins have been implicated in developmental processes including regulation of cell fate and patterning during embryogenesis, as well as in oncogenesis.

== Gene ==
This protein is 96% identical to the mouse Wnt10b protein at the amino acid level. The WNT10B gene is clustered with another family member, WNT1, in the chromosome 12q13 region.

== Function ==
This gene is a member of the WNT gene family and encodes a secreted signaling protein involved in regulating developmental and homeostatic processes. Wnt10b signaling has been implicated as a molecular switch governing adipogenesis, where activation suppresses adipocyte differentiation and promotes alternative cell fates.

Experimental studies have also implicated Wnt10b in tissue regeneration. Gain-of-function of Wnt10b in mouse hearts improved cardiac tissue repair after myocardial injury by promoting coronary vessel formation and attenuating pathological fibrosis.

== Clinical significance ==
WNT10B expression has been implicated in breast cancer.

A study published in 2025 identified an additional role for Wnt10b in promoting tolerance to replication stress in cancer cells. Under conditions of excessive proliferation, Wnt10b signaling was shown to limit replication stress–induced chromosomal instability by modulating microtubule dynamics and reducing chromosome segregation defects, thereby supporting tumor cell survival.

Because chromosomal instability contributes to tumor evolution and therapeutic resistance, inhibition of Wnt10b signaling has been proposed as a potential anticancer strategy to increase sensitivity to DNA-damaging therapies and chemotherapy.
