= SMOC2 =

Protein

Identifiers
- Aliases: SMOC2, DTDP1, MST117, MSTP117, MSTP140, SMAP2, bA270C4A.1, bA37D8.1, dJ421D16.1, SPARC related modular calcium binding 2
- External IDs: OMIM: 607223; MGI: 1929881; GeneCards: SMOC2

Gene location (Human)
Chr.	Chromosome 6 (human)
Band	6q27	Start	168,441,151 bp
Band	6q27	End	168,673,445 bp

Gene location (Mouse)
Chr.	Chromosome 17 (mouse)
Band	17 A2|17 8.95 cM	Start	14,499,768 bp
Band	17 A2|17 8.95 cM	End	14,625,052 bp
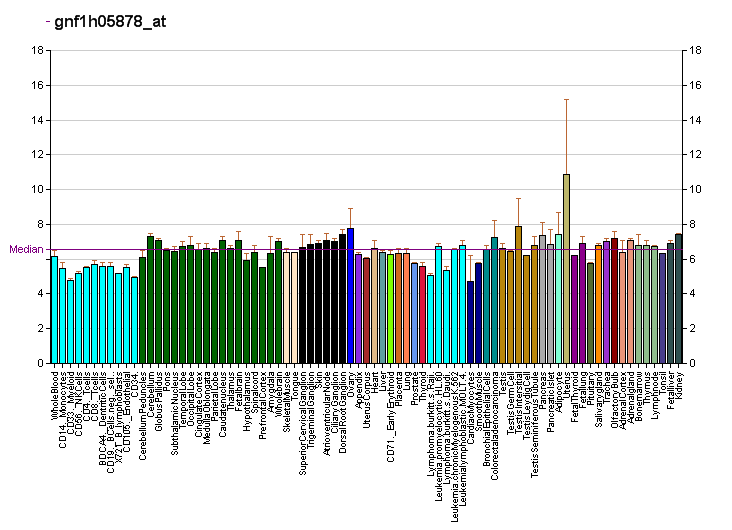
RNA expression pattern
Bgee	Human / Mouse (ortholog); Top expressed in: Descending thoracic aorta; ascending aorta; right coronary artery; left uterine tube; gastric mucosa; gallbladder; body of uterus; left coronary artery; tibia; myometrium / Top expressed in: gastrula; saccule; decidua; sciatic nerve; vas deferens; intercostal muscle; efferent ductule; cervix; lumbar spinal ganglion; triceps brachii muscle; More reference expression data
BioGPS	More reference expression data
Gene ontology
Molecular function	calcium ion binding; glycosaminoglycan binding; heparin binding; metal ion binding
Cellular component	extracellular region; basement membrane; interstitial matrix; extracellular space; collagen-containing extracellular matrix; cell periphery; extracellular matrix
Biological process	extracellular matrix organization; signal transduction; positive regulation of cell-substrate adhesion; positive regulation of endothelial cell migration; positive regulation of vascular wound healing; positive regulation of angiogenesis; positive regulation of mitotic cell cycle; positive regulation of vascular endothelial growth factor signaling pathway; positive regulation of DNA biosynthetic process; positive regulation of endothelial cell chemotaxis; positive regulation of fibroblast growth factor receptor signaling pathway
Sources:Amigo / QuickGO
Orthologs
Databases	NCBI: entry; OMA: entry
Species	Human	Mouse
Entrez	64094	64074
Ensembl	ENSG00000112562	ENSMUSG00000023886
UniProt	Q9H3U7	Q8CD91
RefSeq (mRNA)	NM_001166412; NM_022138	NM_022315
RefSeq (protein)	NP_001159884; NP_071421	NP_071710
Location (UCSC)	Chr 6: 168.44 – 168.67 Mb	Chr 17: 14.5 – 14.63 Mb
PubMed search
- Wikidata
View/Edit Human	View/Edit Mouse

SPARC-related modular calcium-binding protein 2 is a protein that in humans is encoded by the SMOC2 gene.

== Clinical relevance ==
This gene has been shown mutated in clinical cases of major dental developmental defects.

Brachycephalic dogs show a shortening of the snout along with a widening of the hard palate. This skull form is highly associated with disorders of breathing and of the eyes. Brachycephaly in dogs is correlated to a retrotransposon induced missplicing the SMOC2 gene.
