= AAGAB =

Protein found in humans

Identifiers
- Aliases: AAGAB, KPPP1, PPKP1, PPKP1A, p34, FLJ11506, alpha- and gamma-adaptin binding protein, alpha and gamma adaptin binding protein
- External IDs: OMIM: 614888; MGI: 1914189; HomoloGene: 11648; GeneCards: AAGAB; OMA:AAGAB - orthologs

Gene location (Human)
| Chr. | Chromosome 15 (human) |
| Band | 15q23 | Start | 67,200,667 bp |
| Band | 15q23 | End | 67,255,195 bp |

Gene location (Mouse)
| Chr. | Chromosome 9 (mouse) |
| Band | 9|9 C | Start | 63,509,942 bp |
| Band | 9|9 C | End | 63,551,870 bp |
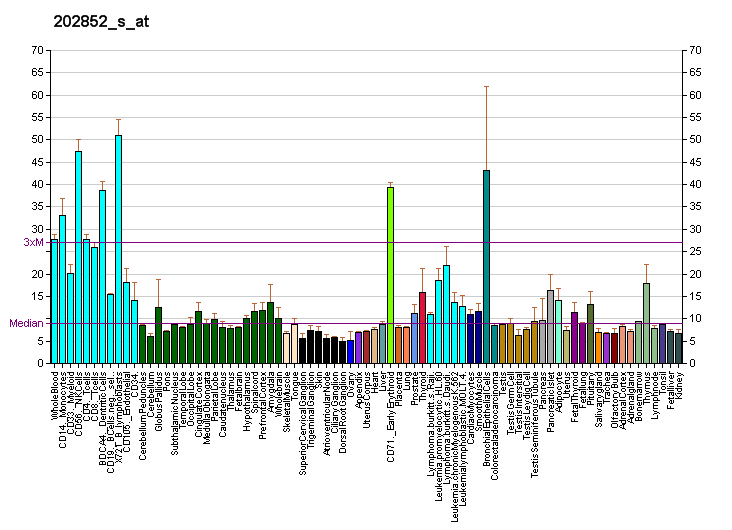

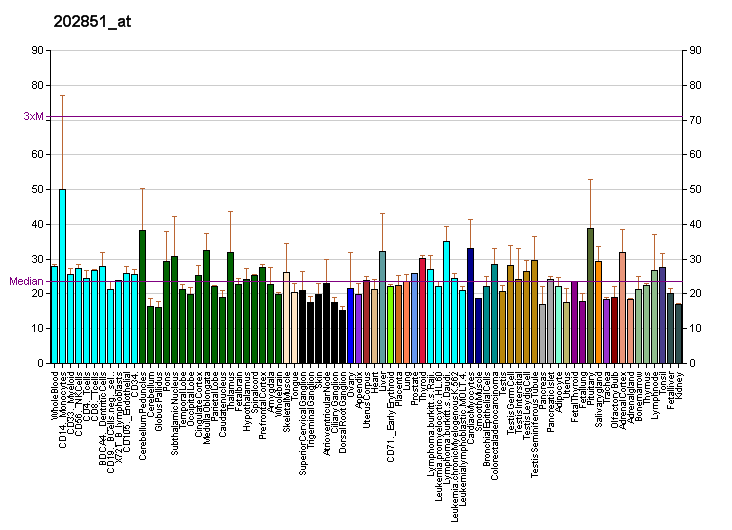
RNA expression pattern
| Bgee | Human / Mouse (ortholog); Top expressed in: islet of Langerhans; rectum; mucosa of transverse colon; gastrocnemius muscle; prefrontal cortex; monocyte; stromal cell of endometrium; secondary oocyte; anterior pituitary; Achilles tendon / Top expressed in: spermatocyte; otic vesicle; lumbar spinal ganglion; lacrimal gland; dentate gyrus of hippocampal formation granule cell; lens; granulocyte; lobe of prostate; ascending aorta; transitional epithelium of urinary bladder; More reference expression data |
| BioGPS | More reference expression data |
Gene ontology
| Molecular function | protein binding |
| Cellular component | cytoplasm; cytosol; nuclear speck |
| Biological process | protein transport |
Sources:Amigo / QuickGO
Orthologs
| Species | Human | Mouse |
| Entrez | 79719 | 66939 |
| Ensembl | ENSG00000103591 | ENSMUSG00000037257 |
| UniProt | Q6PD74 | Q8R2R3 |
| RefSeq (mRNA) | NM_001271885; NM_001271886; NM_024666 | NM_025857; NM_001357323 |
| RefSeq (protein) | NP_001258814; NP_001258815; NP_078942 | NP_080133; NP_001344252 |
| Location (UCSC) | Chr 15: 67.2 – 67.26 Mb | Chr 9: 63.51 – 63.55 Mb |
| PubMed search |
- Wikidata
| View/Edit Human | View/Edit Mouse |

Alpha- and Gamma-Adaptin Binding Protein, also known as AAGAB, is a human gene.
