= EDARADD =

Protein-coding gene in humans

Identifiers
- Aliases: EDARADD, ECTD11A, ECTD11B, ED3, EDA3, EDAR-associated death domain, EDAR associated death domain
- External IDs: OMIM: 606603; MGI: 1931001; GeneCards: EDARADD

Gene location (Human)
Chr.	Chromosome 1 (human)
Band	1q42.3-q43	Start	236,348,257 bp
Band	1q42.3-q43	End	236,502,915 bp

Gene location (Mouse)
Chr.	Chromosome 13 (mouse)
Band	13 A1|13 4.77 cM	Start	12,487,513 bp
Band	13 A1|13 4.77 cM	End	12,535,319 bp
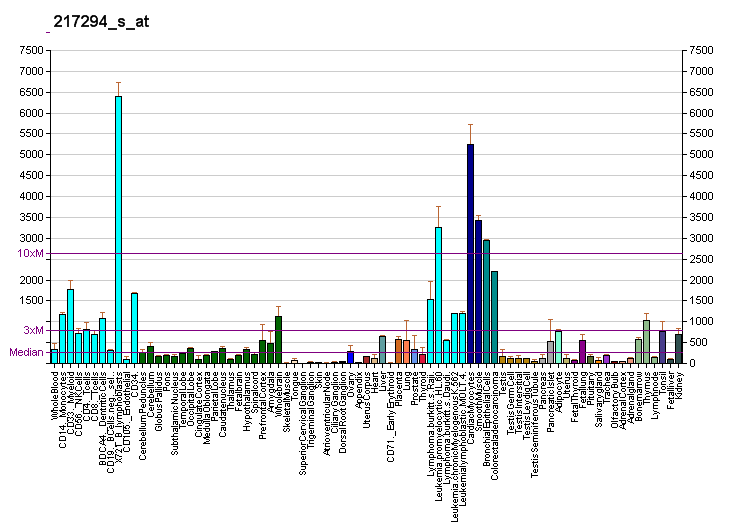
RNA expression pattern
Bgee	Human / Mouse (ortholog); Top expressed in: islet of Langerhans; sural nerve; testicle; gonad; olfactory zone of nasal mucosa; body of stomach; skin of abdomen; mucosa of esophagus; granulocyte; skin of leg / Top expressed in: hair follicle; Rostral migratory stream; conjunctival fornix; medullary collecting duct; epithelium of lens; pharynx; iris; condyle; fossa; vestibular sensory epithelium; More reference expression data
BioGPS	More reference expression data
Gene ontology
Molecular function	protein binding
Cellular component	cytoplasm; cytosol
Biological process	multicellular organism development; cell differentiation; tumor necrosis factor-mediated signaling pathway; signal transduction
Sources:Amigo / QuickGO
Orthologs
Databases	NCBI: entry; OMA: entry
Species	Human	Mouse
Entrez	128178	171211
Ensembl	ENSG00000186197	ENSMUSG00000095105
UniProt	Q8WWZ3	Q8VHX2; Q5D0F1
RefSeq (mRNA)	NM_145861; NM_080738	NM_133643
RefSeq (protein)	NP_542776; NP_665860	NP_598398
Location (UCSC)	Chr 1: 236.35 – 236.5 Mb	Chr 13: 12.49 – 12.54 Mb
PubMed search
- Wikidata
View/Edit Human	View/Edit Mouse

Ectodysplasin-A receptor-associated adapter protein is a protein that in humans is encoded by the EDARADD gene.

== Function ==
This gene was identified by its association with ectodermal dysplasia, and specifically with hypohidrotic ectodermal dysplasia, a genetic disorder characterized by defective development of hair, teeth, and eccrine sweat glands. The protein encoded by this gene is a death domain-containing protein, and is found to interact with EDAR, a death domain receptor known to be required for the development of hair, teeth and other ectodermal derivatives. This protein and EDAR are coexpressed in epithelial cells during the formation of hair follicles and teeth. Through its interaction with EDAR, this protein acts as an adaptor, and links the receptor to downstream signaling pathways. Two alternatively spliced transcript variants of this gene encoding distinct isoforms have been reported.

== Interactions ==
EDARADD has been shown to interact with TRAF2.
