= Ectodermal dysplasia =

Group of genetic conditions affecting the embryonic ectoderm

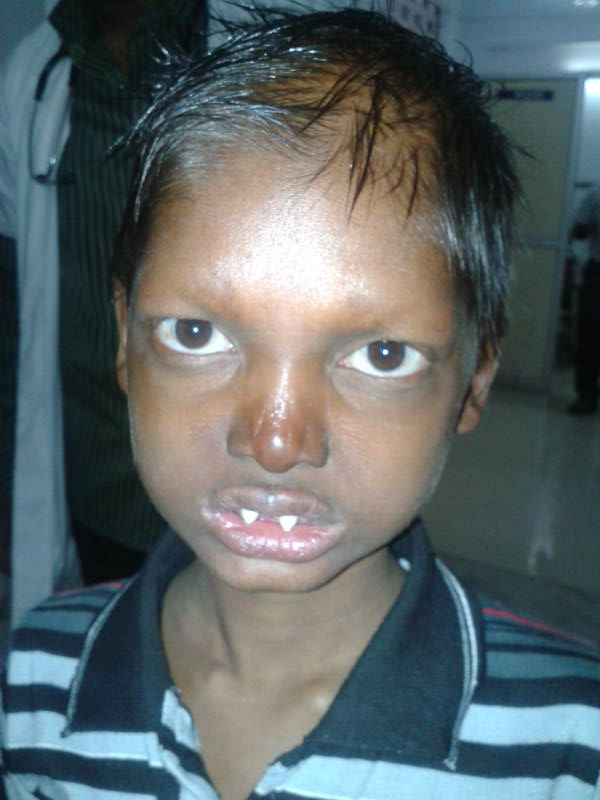
- A patient displaying the peg-shaped teeth and sparse hair characteristic of classical ectodermal dysplasia.
- Specialty: Medical genetics

Ectodermal dysplasia (ED) refers to a group of genetic disorders characterized by the abnormal development or function of two or more structures that originate from the ectoderm, the outer layer of an embryo. These structures include hair, teeth, nails, and sweat glands, all of which may develop abnormally in people with ED. There are over 200 different syndromes classified under ED, each with a range of symptoms and genetic causes. The most common type is hypohidrotic ectodermal dysplasia (HED), which affects approximately 1 in every 5,000 to 10,000 live births. HED primarily affects males because it is typically inherited through the X chromosome.

The genetic cause of ED lies in mutations, or changes, in certain genes that play an essential role in forming ectodermal structures. These genes are part of signalling pathways—most notably, the EDA/NF-kappaB pathway—which guide the development of hair, skin, nails, teeth, and glands during embryonic growth. Genes such as EDA, EDAR, and EDARADD are key players in this process, and variants in these genes disrupt normal development, resulting in the characteristic symptoms of ED. Beyond HED, other types of ED follow different inheritance patterns, such as autosomal dominant or autosomal recessive, but often show similar physical traits, though with different genetic mutations.

Diagnosing ED usually involves a clinical examination focused on core symptoms, such as lack of sweating, specific dental and hair abnormalities, and characteristic facial features. Genetic testing can confirm the diagnosis, especially when there is a family history of ED or when prenatal screening is considered.

== Presentation ==
=== Hair ===
Individuals with ED commonly experience sparse or absent hair, a condition known as hypotrichosis. Scalp hair is typically fine and brittle and may lack pigmentation, appearing light or wispy. Eyebrows and eyelashes may also be sparse or absent, contributing to the distinct facial appearance seen in ED. The pattern of hair growth on the body and face can vary among ED types, with some individuals retaining body or facial hair while others do not.

=== Nails ===
Nail abnormalities in ED often manifest as dysplastic or poorly formed nails. Affected individuals may have thin, brittle, or ridged nails that are prone to splitting and breaking. In severe cases, nails may be entirely absent or exhibit atypical growth patterns, including spoon-like (koilonychia) or thickened (pachyonychia) appearances.

=== Skin ===
Skin in individuals with ED is frequently dry and thin, and may display hyperkeratosis, especially on the palms and soles. This dryness is largely due to reduced sebaceous gland function, which normally helps maintain skin moisture. Periorbital hyperpigmentation, or darkening around the eyes, is also common, and the skin can appear more fragile or prone to infections.

=== Sweat glands ===
A significant feature of many ED types is the absence or reduced function of sweat glands, leading to conditions known as hypohidrosis or anhidrosis. The inability to produce sufficient sweat disrupts normal thermoregulation, particularly in warm environments, and can lead to overheating or hyperthermia. This lack of sweat production is especially pronounced in hypohidrotic ectodermal dysplasia (HED), where sweat gland function is minimal to nonexistent.

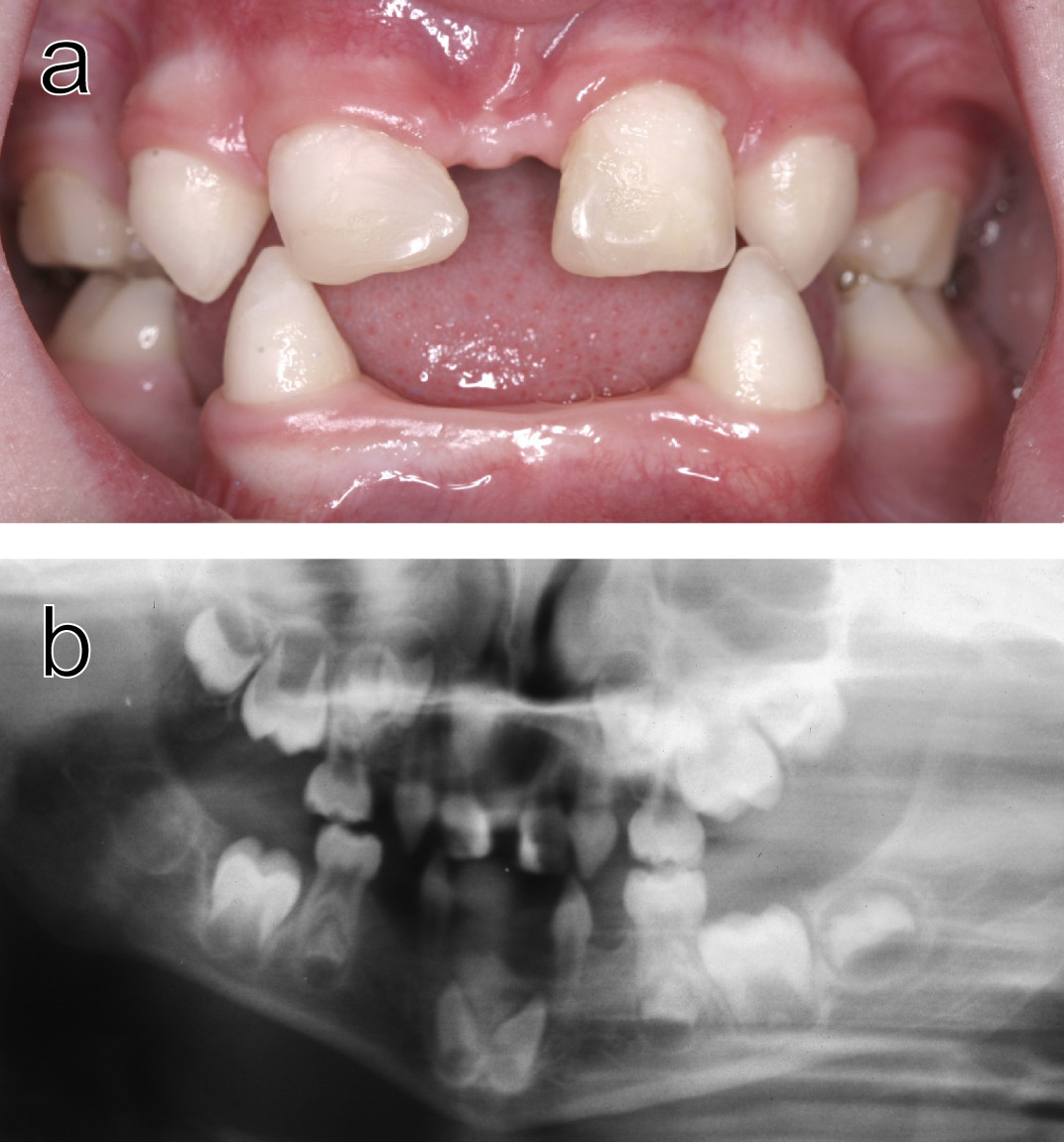
Dental abnormalities in a 5-year-old girl from north Sweden family who had various symptoms of autosomal dominant hypohidrotic ectodermal dysplasia (HED): a) Intraoral view. Note that the upper incisors have been restored with composite material to disguise their original conical shape. b) Orthopantomogram showing absence of ten primary and eleven permanent teeth in the jaws of the same individual.

=== Salivary glands ===
Dysfunction or underdevelopment of the salivary glands, known as salivary hypoplasia, is a common feature in ED and results in xerostomia, or dry mouth. This lack of saliva can increase the risk of dental decay, as saliva is essential for oral health. Reduced saliva production can also complicate swallowing and speech, making it necessary for individuals to consume fluids frequently during meals.

=== Teeth ===
Dental anomalies are among the most recognizable features of ED, with common findings including hypodontia (missing teeth), oligodontia (absence of six or more teeth), and anodontia (complete absence of teeth). Teeth that are present often exhibit unusual shapes, such as conical or peg-like forms, particularly in the anterior regions of the mouth. Delayed tooth eruption and other structural defects, such as taurodontism (enlarged pulp chambers), are also frequently observed. These dental issues often necessitate early and prolonged dental treatments, including prosthodontics (dentures) and orthodontics (braces).

=== Other features ===
Beyond the primary ectodermal structures, ED can impact additional organs and tissues, leading to a wide range of associated features. Abnormalities in the lacrimal glands can result in reduced tear production, leading to dry eyes and an increased risk of eye infections. Similarly, nasal gland abnormalities often lead to dry nasal passages, which may contribute to respiratory issues, including frequent nasal congestion or infections. Hearing impairment is also reported in some individuals with ED due to structural defects in the ear, particularly in syndromes where the ectoderm-derived middle ear structures are underdeveloped.

ED can also affect the facial bones and overall facial structure, leading to distinct craniofacial characteristics. Affected individuals may have a prominent forehead, a saddle-shaped or flattened nasal bridge, and protruding lips. In some cases, ED-associated mutations also impact skeletal development in areas beyond the face, contributing to additional physical characteristics such as a smaller-than-average jaw or other skeletal anomalies.

== Genetics ==
There are several different types of ED, each associated with distinct genetic causes:

- Hay–Wells syndrome (Rapp–Hodgkin syndrome) and EEC syndrome are all associated with TP63.
- Hypohidrotic ectodermal dysplasia can be associated with EDA, EDAR and EDARADD.
- Margarita Island ectodermal dysplasia is associated with PVRL1.
- Ectodermal dysplasia with skin fragility is associated with PKP1.
- Clouston's hidrotic ectodermal dysplasia is associated with GJB6.
- Naegeli syndrome/Dermatopathia pigmentosa reticulariss is associated with KRT14.
- Pachyonychia congenita is caused by multiple keratins.
- Focal dermal hypoplasia is associated with PORCN.
- Ellis–van Creveld syndrome is associated with EVC.

== Diagnosis ==
Diagnosis of ED is usually made based on episodes of unusual fevers (hyperpyrexia) brought about by absence or immaturity of sweat glands, as well as absence or type of hair or the absence and morphology of the teeth. Clinical diagnosis, however, is often difficult during early infancy, as the above-mentioned manifestations are hard to detect.

Laboratory investigations for ED include determination of quantitative immunoglobulin levels and T-cell subset populations, as ED cases associated with immunodeficiency may present signs of hypogammaglobulinemia with impaired cell-mediated immunity and lymphocyte proliferation. Additional tests include sweat pore count, which involves application of yellow starch-iodine powder to the palmar or dorsal skin. Sweat pores are visualized when sweating turns the yellow starch-iodine powder to deep purple. Skin biopsy is another diagnostic method that allows for documentation of hypohidrosis and reduced number of eccrine sweat glands.

Molecular genetic testing includes sequencing the EDA gene, which is the only gene associated with X-linked hypohidrotic ED. About 95% of the EDA mutations, including nonsense, missense and smaller deletion mutations, can be identified by sequencing of the EDA's eight exons with flanking introns. Additionally, sequencing EDAR and EDARADD coding and flanking intron regions can aid in identification o autosomal dominant and autosomal recessive forms of HED.

Sequence analysis of EDA does not allow for detection of exonic, multi-exonic or whole gene deletions in female patients.

== Treatment ==
Treatment for ED primarily focuses on managing symptoms and enhancing the quality of life, as there is currently no cure for the condition. A multidisciplinary approach is essential, involving dermatologists, dentists, otolaryngologists, and other specialists to address the wide range of manifestations associated with ED. Treatment approaches vary based on the specific ED subtype and the severity of symptoms, but generally target issues with skin, dental health, temperature regulation, and other affected areas.

=== Dental treatment ===
Dental management is a cornerstone of ED treatment due to the common occurrence of missing, malformed, or delayed eruption of teeth. Dental prostheses, such as dentures, partial dentures, or implants, are frequently used to restore function and aesthetics in patients with hypodontia, oligodontia, or anodontia. Prosthetic treatment may begin in early childhood to aid in speech development and proper nutrition, with adjustments made as the child grows. Orthodontic interventions, such as braces or aligners, are often necessary to manage spacing issues and align the existing teeth, particularly when dental implants are planned for later stages. In some cases, maxillofacial surgery may be indicated to address jaw or facial bone discrepancies resulting from the absence of teeth and underdeveloped jaw structures.

For young patients, removable prosthetics with expansion screws are often used to promote maxillomandibular growth, accommodating changes as the child’s facial structure develops. As patients mature, osseointegrated dental implants and implant-supported prostheses may be considered for a more permanent solution, though these require sufficient bone development to support the implants.

=== Skin and nail care ===
Skin management in ED aims to alleviate dryness, prevent cracking, and reduce susceptibility to infections. Moisturizing creams and emollients are commonly recommended to help retain moisture in the skin and manage hyperkeratosis (thickened skin) often seen on the palms and soles. In cases where nails are severely affected, protective measures and nail care routines, including trimming and filing, are advised to minimize discomfort and reduce the risk of nail damage. Some patients may benefit from specialized dermatologic treatments tailored to their skin’s unique needs, especially when hyperkeratosis or periorbital pigmentation is pronounced.

=== Temperature regulation ===
Thermoregulatory issues are a significant concern for individuals with ED, particularly those with hypohidrosis or anhidrosis, who have a reduced ability or inability to sweat. Careful management is necessary to prevent overheating, especially in warm climates or during physical activity. Cooling vests, fans, and frequent hydration are often recommended to help regulate body temperature. Parents of young children with ED are advised to monitor their child’s activity levels and environment closely, ensuring access to cool spaces and plenty of fluids. In some cases, cold-water mist sprays or cooling packs are used to quickly lower body temperature if overheating occurs.

=== Eye and nasal care ===
Due to potential abnormalities in lacrimal and nasal glands, individuals with ED may experience dry eyes and nasal passages. Artificial tears are often prescribed to alleviate dry eye symptoms and reduce the risk of eye infections. Regular nasal irrigation with saline solutions is recommended to keep nasal passages moist, which can help prevent nasal congestion and respiratory infections. Humidifiers may also be beneficial in maintaining moisture in the air, particularly in dry climates or during colder months.

=== Hearing and speech therapy ===
In cases where ED affects ear structure or hearing, interventions such as hearing aids may be necessary to improve auditory function. Additionally, speech therapy is often beneficial, especially for children with dental abnormalities that impact speech development. Early intervention with speech therapy can help children develop clear speech patterns and improve communication skills, which may be affected by missing or malformed teeth.

=== Genetic counselling ===
Genetic counselling is recommended for families affected by ED, especially for those considering having children. Counselling provides information about the inheritance patterns, the likelihood of transmitting ED to offspring, and the available options for prenatal testing. This guidance can be valuable for family planning and in understanding the broader genetic implications of the disorder.

== Society and culture ==
=== Notable people diagnosed with ED ===
- Michael Berryman, American actor with hypohidrotic ectodermal dysplasia
- Melanie Gaydos, American model
- Levi Hawken, New Zealand skateboarder and artist who became well known in 2011 in New Zealand for the "Nek minnit" viral video on YouTube
- Shahzad Ismaily, American musician
- Cory DeVantè Williams known online professionally as CoryxKenshin
- Javante Carter, Internet personality and comedian known professionally as HolyGxd (HolyGod)
- Tokie du Prez, African actor and musician with hypohidrotic ectodermal dysplasia, adopted child of Die Antwoord
- Patrick M. Brenner, American nonprofit executive and political commentator

== See also ==
- List of cutaneous conditions
- List of cutaneous conditions caused by mutations in keratins
