= Dairy (New Zealand) =

New Zealand term for a convenience store

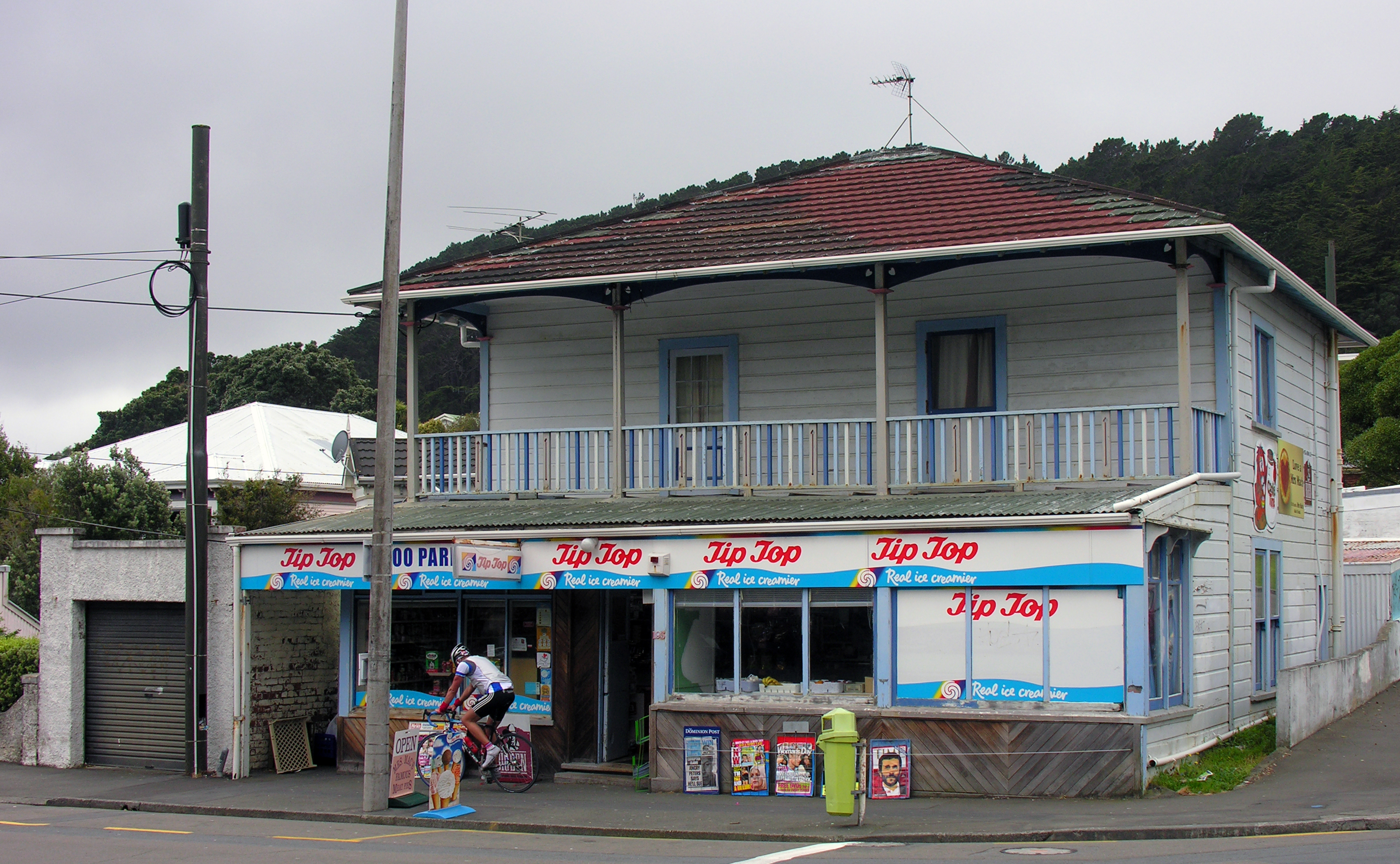
A dairy in Newtown, Wellington

In New Zealand, a dairy is a small owner-operated convenience shop licensed to sell groceries, eggs, milk, dairy products, perishables, newspapers and other staples during and after normal trading hours.

== Origins and usage ==
The term dairy came into common usage in New Zealand English to describe small shops by the late 1930s. Perishables such as milk and eggs were formerly delivered to city households from a dairy farm; by the late 1930s, small shops stocked such produce, and the term shifted to describe these shops. In addition to this meaning, New Zealand English retains the common meanings of dairy, referring to milk, milk-derived products and associated industries.

The distinction between dairies, superettes and grocery stores has grown increasingly blurred in New Zealand English, a fact acknowledged by the Liquor Licensing Authority in 1991, and by the Law Commission. Contributing factors to this blurring of meanings include the deregulation of trading shop hours on Sundays, ambiguity over alcohol sales laws (see § Sales of alcohol and legal highs below), and the abolition of restrictions on types of goods permitted to be sold by dairies. The Law Commission summed up the ambiguity as follows:

Traditionally, a dairy was a small shop in a suburban area that sold goods such as butter, milk, bread and confectionery. It was able to trade outside normal trading hours. Today, the term "dairy" has different meanings for different people, and there seem to be fewer dairies in the traditional sense still in operation, although many shops still have "dairy" in their trading name.

— Law Commission, Alcohol In Our Lives: Curbing the Harm

== Business and culture ==
Dairies rely on long hours rather than high markups to make money, and are not overly profitable. As small operators, they cannot get bulk discounts that supermarkets get. As dairies must remain open long hours to stay profitable, they are almost always family-run businesses that utilise family members to run the shop. New Zealand introduced the 40-hour working week in 1945, ending Saturday trading hours for most grocers. Dairies were allowed to stay open outside normal working hours and on Saturdays.

During the 1990s and 2000s, dairies became less profitable as other stores made inroads into their niche as nearby stores open outside regular trading hours. As supermarkets opened for longer hours with the introduction of deregulated shopping hours in 1990, and petrol stations extended the range of goods they sold, dairies began to lose their competitive advantage.

=== Immigrant ownership ===
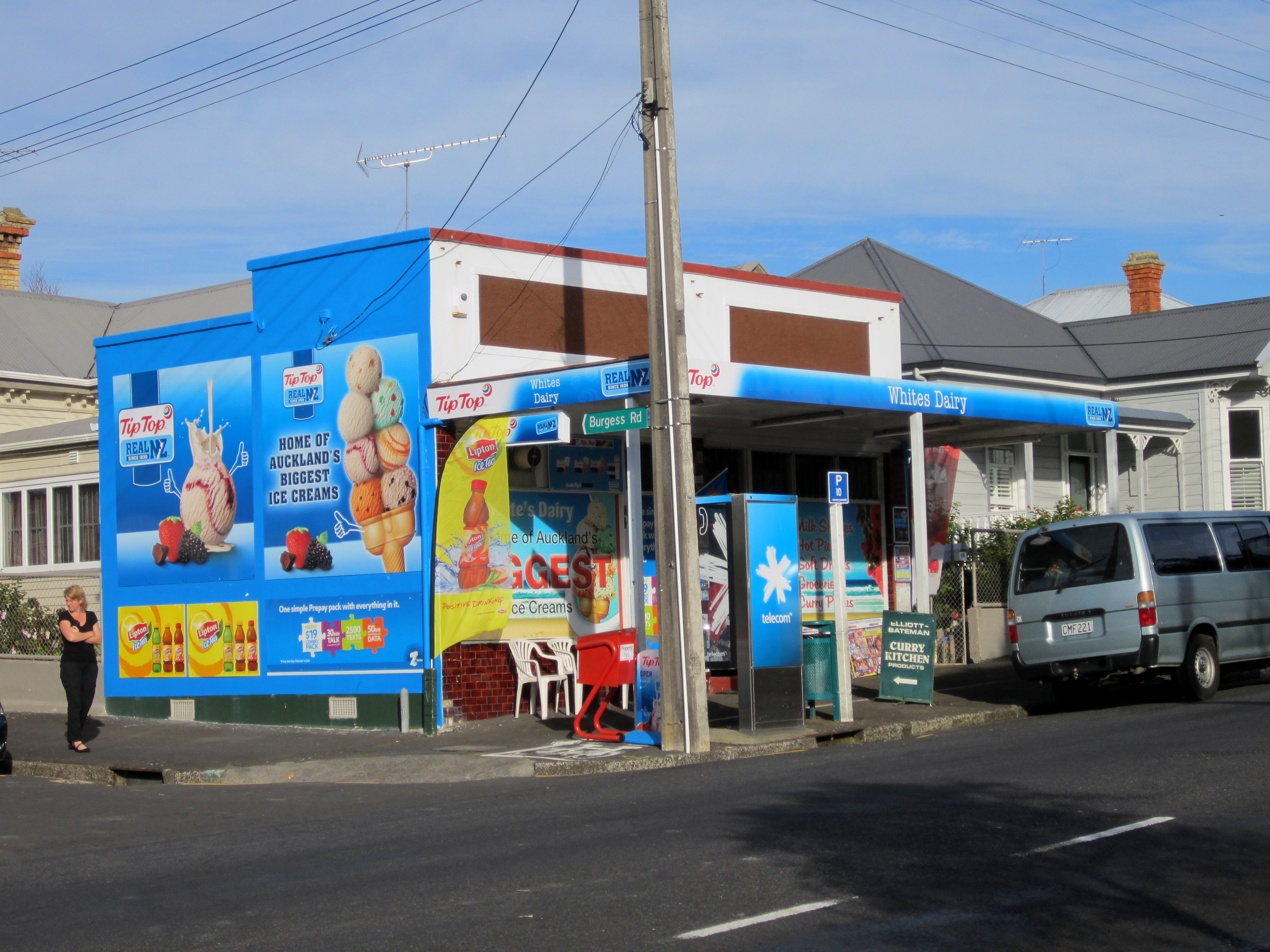
A dairy in Devonport, Auckland. Signs outside advertise Tip Top ice cream and curry.

A 1994 study found that 227 of the 269 dairies (84.387%) in central Auckland were owned by Indians. Dairies are often self-owned by immigrants, who may face difficulties entering the workforce. Some dairy owners intended to give their children white collar or professional occupations, while other dairies had inter-generational ownership, with children taking over the store when they reach adulthood.

=== Sales of alcohol and legal highs ===
The Sale of Liquor Act (1989) prohibited the sale of liquor in "any shop of a kind commonly known as a dairy", without explicitly defining what a dairy was. In the wake of the act, dairies began altering their stock in order to qualify for a liquor license. This resulted in "a proliferation of small stores distinguishable from dairies only because they are licensed to sell alcohol." The legislation contributed to the blurring distinction between dairies and grocery stores in New Zealand English.

The Sale and Supply of Alcohol Act 2012 sought to close this unintended loophole, clarifying the types of stores eligible to sell alcohol and ensuring dairies and convenience stores cannot sell alcohol. The law attracted criticism from dairy owners.

The Psychoactive Substances Act (2013) prohibits dairies from selling legal highs.

== See also ==
- Superette
- Convenience store
- Milk bar
