= Hyperkeratosis =

Skin thickening from keratin accumulation

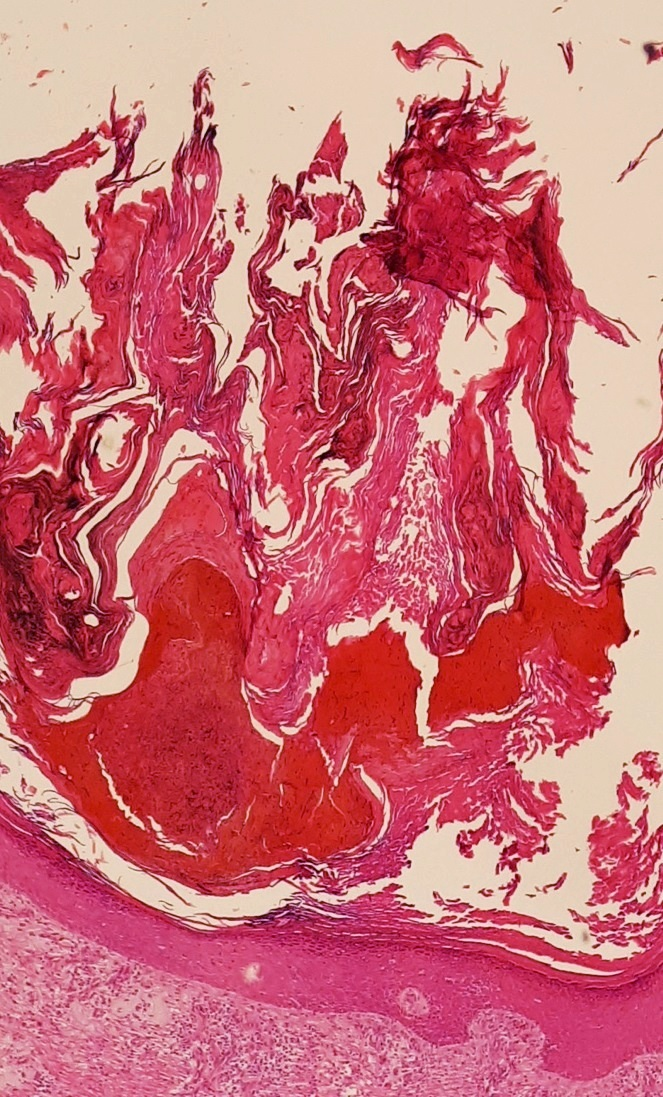
- Micrograph showing prominent hyperkeratosis in skin without atypia. H&E stain.
- Pronunciation: /ˌhaɪpərkɛrəˈtoʊsɪs/ (hyper- + kerato- + -osis)
- Specialty: Dermatology

Hyperkeratosis is thickening of the stratum corneum (the outermost layer of the epidermis, or skin), often associated with the presence of an abnormal quantity of keratin, and is usually accompanied by an increase in the granular layer. As the corneum layer normally varies greatly in thickness in different sites, some experience is needed to assess minor degrees of hyperkeratosis.

It can be caused by vitamin A deficiency or chronic exposure to arsenic.

Hyperkeratosis can also be caused by B-Raf inhibitor drugs such as vemurafenib and dabrafenib.

It can be treated with urea-containing creams, which dissolve the intercellular matrix of the cells of the stratum corneum, promoting desquamation of scaly skin, eventually resulting in softening of hyperkeratotic areas.

== Types ==
=== Follicular ===
Follicular hyperkeratosis, also known as keratosis pilaris (KP), is a skin condition characterized by excessive development of keratin in hair follicles, resulting in rough, cone-shaped, elevated papules. The openings are often closed with a white plug of encrusted sebum. When called phrynoderma, the condition is associated with nutritional deficiency or malnourishment.

This condition has been shown in several small-scale studies to respond well to supplementation with vitamins and fats rich in essential fatty acids. Deficiencies of vitamin E, vitamin A, and B-complex vitamins have been implicated in causing the condition. Follicular hyperkeratosis is also a symptom in inherited collagen-related diseases of Ehlers-Danlos syndromes and Bethlem myopathy.

=== By other specific site ===
- Plantar hyperkeratosis is hyperkeratosis of the sole of the foot. It is recommended to surgically remove the dead skin, to provide symptomatic relief.
- Hyperkeratosis of the nipple and areola is an uncommon benign, asymptomatic, acquired condition of unknown pathogenesis.

=== Hereditary ===
- Epidermolytic hyperkeratosis (also known as "Bullous congenital ichthyosiform erythroderma," "Bullous ichthyosiform erythroderma," or "bullous congenital ichthyosiform erythroderma of Brocq") is a rare skin disease in the ichthyosis family, affecting around 1 in 250,000 people. It involves the clumping of keratin filaments.
- Multiple minute digitate hyperkeratosis, a rare cutaneous condition, with about half of cases being familial
- Focal acral hyperkeratosis (also known as "Acrokeratoelastoidosis lichenoides,") is a late-onset keratoderma, inherited as an autosomal dominant condition, characterized by oval or polygonal crateriform papules developing along the border of the hands, feet, and wrists.
- Keratosis pilaris appears similar to gooseflesh, is usually asymptomatic and may be treated by moisturizing the skin.

=== Other ===
- Hyperkeratosis lenticularis perstans (also known as "Flegel's disease") is a cutaneous condition characterized by rough, yellow-brown keratotic, flat-topped papules.

== In mucous membranes ==
The term hyperkeratosis is often used in connection with lesions of the mucous membranes, such as leukoplakia. Because of the differences between mucous membranes and the skin (e.g., keratinizing mucosa does not have a stratum lucidum and non keratinizing mucosa does not have this layer or normally a stratum corneum or a stratum granulosum), sometimes specialized texts give slightly different definitions of hyperkeratosis in the context of mucosae. Examples are "an excessive formation of keratin (e.g., as seen in leukoplakia)" and "an increase in the thickness of the keratin layer of the epithelium, or the presence of such a layer in a site where none would normally be expected."

== Etymology and pronunciation ==
The word hyperkeratosis (/ˌhaɪpərˌkɛrəˈtoʊsɪs/) is based on the Ancient Greek morphemes hyper- + kerato- + -osis, meaning 'the condition of too much keratin'.

== Hyperkeratosis in dogs ==
Nasodigitic hyperkeratosis in dogs may be idiopathic, secondary to an underlying disease, or due to congenital abnormalities in the normal anatomy of the nose and fingertips.

In the case of congenital anatomical abnormalities, contact between the affected area and rubbing surfaces is impaired. It is roughly the same with finger pads — in animals with an anatomical abnormality, part of the pad is not in contact with rubbing surfaces and excessive keratin deposition is formed. The idiopathic form of nasodigitic hyperkeratosis in dogs develops from unknown causes and is more common in older animals (senile form). Of all dog breeds, Labradors, Golden Retrievers, Cocker Spaniels, Irish Terriers, Bordeaux Dogs are the most prone to hyperkeratosis.

=== Therapy ===
Since the deposition of excess keratin cannot be stopped, therapy is aimed at softening and removing it. For moderate to severe cases, the affected areas should be hydrated (moisturised) with warm water or compresses for 5–10 minutes. Softening preparations are then applied once a day until the excess keratin is removed.

In dogs with severe hyperkeratosis and a significant excess of keratin, it is removed with scissors or a blade. After proper instructions, pet owners are able to perform this procedure at home, and it may be the only method of correction.

== See also ==
- Calluses
- Keratin disease
- List of skin diseases
- Skin disease
- Skin lesion
- Epidermal hyperplasia
