= Palmoplantar keratoderma =

Abnormal thickening of skin in the palms or soles

- Other names: Vohwinkel's syndrome
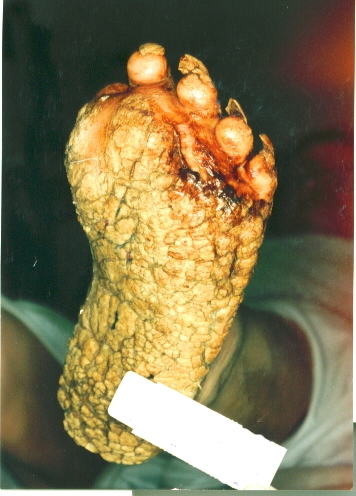
- Patient with severe plantar keratosis
- Specialty: Dermatology

Palmoplantar keratodermas are a heterogeneous group of skin disorders characterized by abnormal thickening (scleroderma) of the stratum corneum of the palms and soles.

Autosomal recessive, dominant, X-linked, and acquired forms have all been described in medical literature.

== Types ==
Clinically, three distinct patterns of palmoplantar keratoderma may be identified: diffuse, focal, and punctate.

=== Diffuse ===
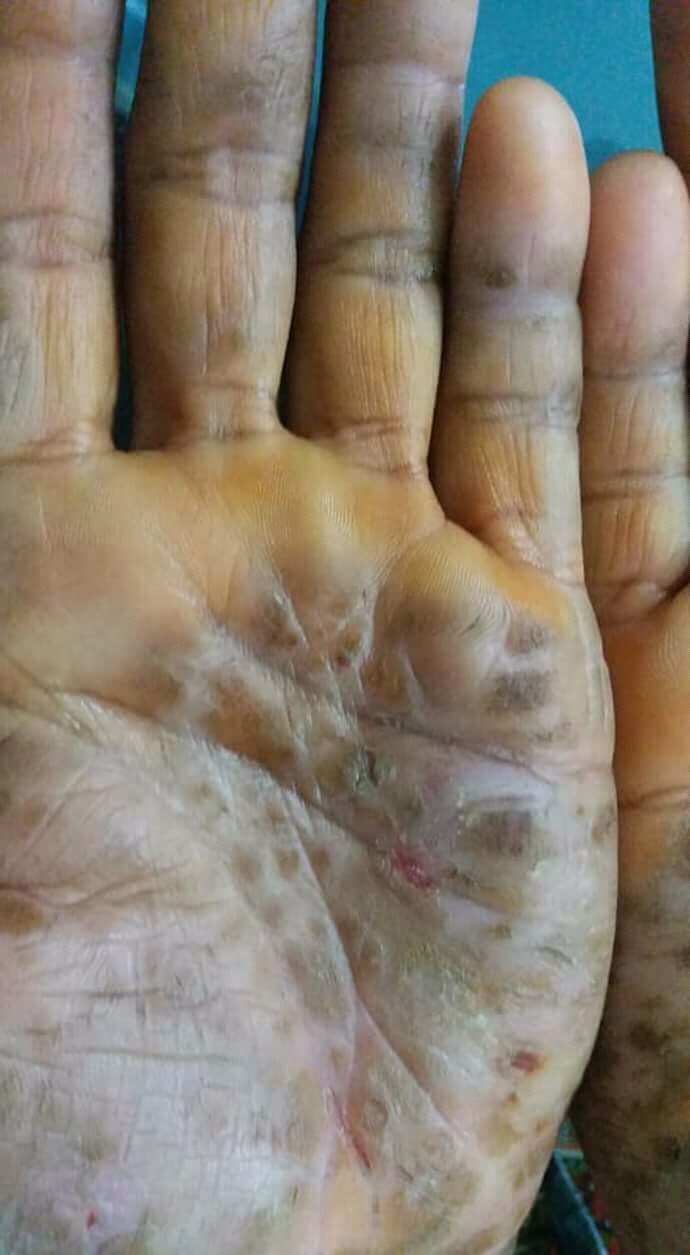
Diffuse palmoplantar keratoderma

Diffuse palmoplantar keratoderma is a type of palmoplantar keratoderma that is characterized by an even, thick, symmetric hyperkeratosis over the whole of the palm and sole, usually evident at birth or in the first few months of life. Restated, diffuse palmoplantar keratoderma is an autosomal dominant disorder in which hyperkeratosis is confined to the palms and soles. The two major types can have a similar clinical appearance:

- Diffuse epidermolytic palmoplantar keratoderma (also known as "Palmoplantar keratoderma cum degeneratione granulosa Vörner", "Vörner's epidermolytic palmoplantar keratoderma", and "Vörner keratoderma") is one of the most common patterns of palmoplantar keratoderma, an autosomal dominant condition that presents within the first few months of life, characterized by a well-demarcated, symmetric thickening of palms and soles, often with a "dirty" snakeskin appearance due to underlying epidermolysis.
- Diffuse nonepidermolytic palmoplantar keratoderma (also known as "Diffuse orthohyperkeratotic keratoderma", "Hereditary palmoplantar keratoderma", "Keratosis extremitatum progrediens", "Keratosis palmoplantaris diffusa circumscripta", "Tylosis", "Unna–Thost disease", and "Unna–Thost keratoderma") is inherited as an autosomal dominant condition and is present from infancy, characterized by a well-demarcated, symmetric, often "waxy" keratoderma involving the whole of the palms and soles.

=== Focal ===
Focal palmoplantar keratoderma, a type of palmoplantar keratoderma in which large, compact masses of keratin develop at sites of recurrent friction, principally on the feet, although also on the palms and other sites, a pattern of calluses that may be discoid (nummular) or linear.

- Focal palmoplantar keratoderma with oral mucosal hyperkeratosis (also known as "Focal epidermolytic palmoplantar keratoderma", "Hereditary painful callosities", "Hereditary painful callosity syndrome", "Keratosis follicularis", "Keratosis palmoplantaris nummularis", and "Nummular epidermolytic palmoplantar keratoderma") is an autosomal dominant keratoderma that represents a clinical overlap syndrome with pachyonychia congenita type I but without the classic nail involvement.

=== Punctate ===
Punctate palmoplantar keratoderma is a form of palmoplantar keratoderma in which many tiny "raindrop" keratoses involve the palmoplantar surface, skin lesions which may involve the whole of the palmoplantar surface, or may be more restricted in their distribution.

- Type 1: Keratosis punctata palmaris et plantaris (also known as "Autosomal-dominant hereditary punctate keratoderma associated with malignancy", "Buschke–Fischer–Brauer disease", "Davis Colley disease", "Keratoderma disseminatum palmaris et plantaris", "Keratosis papulosa", "Keratoderma punctatum", "Keratodermia punctata", "Keratoma hereditarium dissipatum palmare et plantare", "Palmar and plantar seed dermatoses", "Palmar keratoses", "Papulotranslucent acrokeratoderma", "Punctate keratoderma", "Punctate keratoses of the palms and soles", and "Maculosa disseminata") is a skin condition, an autosomal dominant palmoplantar keratoderma with variable penetrance, characterized clinically by multiple, tiny, punctate keratoses over the entire palmoplantar surfaces, beginning over the lateral edge of the digits. It has been linked to 15q22-q24.
- Type 2: Spiny keratoderma (also known as "Porokeratosis punctata palmaris et plantaris", "Punctate keratoderma", and "Punctate porokeratosis of the palms and soles") is an autosomal dominant keratoderma of late onset that develops in patients aged 12 to 50, characterized by multiple tiny keratotic plugs, resembling the spines on a music box, involving the entire palmoplantar surfaces.
- Type 3: Focal acral hyperkeratosis (also known as "Acrokeratoelastoidosis lichenoides", and "Degenerative collagenous plaques of the hand") is a late-onset keratoderma, inherited as an autosomal dominant condition, characterized by oval or polygonal crateriform papules developing along the border of the hands, feet, and wrists. It is considered similar to Costa acrokeratoelastoidosis.

=== Ungrouped ===
- Palmoplantar keratoderma and spastic paraplegia (also known as "Charcot–Marie–Tooth disease with palmoplantar keratoderma and nail dystrophy") is an autosomal dominant or x-linked dominant condition that begins in early childhood with thick focal keratoderma over the soles and, to a lesser extent, the palms.
- Palmoplantar keratoderma of Sybert (also known as "Greither palmoplantar keratoderma", "Greither syndrome", "Keratosis extremitatum hereditaria progrediens", "Keratosis palmoplantaris transgrediens et progrediens" "Sybert keratoderma", and "Transgrediens and progrediens palmoplantar keratoderma") is an extremely rare autosomal dominant keratoderma (a skin condition involving horn-like growths) with symmetric severe involvement of the whole palmoplantar surface in a glove-and-stocking distribution. It was characterized by Aloys Greither in 1952. It was characterized by Virginia Sybert in 1988. An autosomal recessive form which is known as Mal de Meleda has been described. This is associated with mutations in the Secreted Ly-6/uPAR-related protein 1 (SLURP1) gene.
- Striate palmoplantar keratoderma (also known as "Acral keratoderma", "Brünauer-Fuhs-Siemens type of palmoplantar keratoderma", "Focal non-epidermolytic palmoplantar keratoderma", "Keratosis palmoplantaris varians", "Palmoplantar keratoderma areata", "Palmoplantar keratoderma striata", "Wachter keratoderma", and "Wachters palmoplantar keratoderma") is a cutaneous condition, an autosomal dominant keratoderma principally involving the soles with onset in infancy or the first few years of life.
  - Type 1: 148700: DSG1
  - Type 2: 612908: DSP
  - Type 3: 607654: KRT1
- Carvajal syndrome (also known as "Striate palmoplantar keratoderma with woolly hair and cardiomyopathy" and "Striate palmoplantar keratoderma with woolly hair and left ventricular dilated cardiomyopathy",) is a cutaneous condition inherited in an autosomal recessive fashion, and due to a defect in desmoplakin. Striate palmoplantar keratoderma, woolly hair, and left ventricular dilated cardiomyopathy has been described in both autosomal dominant and autosomal recessive forms, but only the recessive forms have a clear association with dilated cardiomyopathy. The skin disease presents as a striate palmoplantar keratoderma with some nonvolar involvement, particularly at sites of pressure or abrasion.
- Scleroatrophic syndrome of Huriez (also known as "Huriez syndrome", "Palmoplantar keratoderma with scleroatrophy", "Palmoplantar keratoderma with sclerodactyly", "Scleroatrophic and keratotic dermatosis of the limbs", and "Sclerotylosis") is an autosomal dominant keratoderma with sclerodactyly present at birth with a diffuse symmetric keratoderma of the palms and soles. An association with 4q23 has been described. It was characterized in 1968.
- Vohwinkel syndrome (also known as "Keratoderma hereditaria mutilans", "Keratoma hereditaria mutilans", "Mutilating keratoderma of Vohwinkel", "Mutilating palmoplantar keratoderma") is a diffuse autosomal dominant keratoderma with onset in early infancy characterized by a honeycombed keratoderma involving the palmoplantar surfaces. Mild to moderate sensorineural hearing loss is often associated. It has been associated with GJB2. It was characterized in 1929.
- Olmsted syndrome (also known as "Mutilating palmoplantar keratoderma with periorificial keratotic plaques", "Mutilating palmoplantar keratoderma with periorificial plaques" and "Polykeratosis of Touraine") is a keratoderma of the palms and soles, with flexion deformity of the digits, that begins in infancy. Treatment with retinoids has been described. It has been associated with mutations in TRPV3.
- Aquagenic keratoderma, also known as acquired aquagenic palmoplantar keratoderma, transient reactive papulotranslucent acrokeratoderma, aquagenic syringeal acrokeratoderma, and aquagenic wrinkling of the palms, is a skin condition characterized by the development of white papules on the palms after water exposure. The condition causes irritation of the palms when touching certain materials after being wet, e.g., paper, cloth. An association with cystic fibrosis has been suggested. The association with cystic fibrosis suggests an increased salt content in the skin.

== Genetics ==
Epidermolytic palmoplantar keratoderma has been associated with keratin 9 and keratin 16.

Nonepidermolytic palmoplantar keratoderma has been associated with keratin 1 and keratin 16.

== See also ==
- Keratoderma
- List of cutaneous conditions
