= Helene Ollendorff Curth =

American dermatologist (1899–1982)

- Born: Helene Ollendorff; 28 February 1899; Breslau, German Empire
- Died: 17 June 1982 (aged 83)
- Occupation: Physician
- Known for: Buschke–Ollendorff syndrome; Ichthyosis Hystrix, Curth-Macklin Type; Ollendorff sign; Curth's criteria; Curth's angle
- Mother: Paula Ollendorff

Academic background
- Education: University of Freiburg; Ludwig-Maximilians-Universität München; University of Breslau
- Alma mater: University of Breslau
- Thesis: (1924)
- Doctoral advisor: Josef Jadassohn
- Other advisor: Abraham Buschke

Academic work
- Discipline: Dermatology
- Sub-discipline: Genodermatosis
- Institutions: Rudolf-Virchow-Krankenhaus, Berlin; Columbia University
- Main interests: Acanthosis nigricans
- Notable ideas: Skin signs associated with internal cancer
- Influenced: Robert J. Gorlin

Helene Ollendorff Curth (28 February 1899 – 17 June 1982) was a German-American dermatologist, known for her studies on acanthosis nigricans (AN) and introducing Curth's criteria, a set of characteristics for associating skin signs as markers for internal cancers. She is named in two rare inherited skin diseases, the Buschke–Ollendorff syndrome and Ichthyosis Hystrix, Curth-Macklin Type. A medical sign in secondary syphilis, known as the Ollendorff sign, and one form of measuring clubbed fingers, known as the Curth's angle, are named after her.

Ollendorff Curth completed her early training under Josef Jadassohn at the University of Breslau. She moved to Berlin in 1924 and was appointed assistant to Abraham Buschke. In 1931 she settled in New York where she established a dermatology practice with her husband and became associated with Columbia University. During her career in the US, she published the first description of cases of Behçet's disease there, introduced patch testing for industrial employees in New York, and worked with Madge Thurlow Macklin.

== Early life and education ==
Helene Ollendorff Curth, affectionately referred to as "Lene", was born on 28 February 1899, into a Jewish family in Wrocław, Poland, then Breslau, Germany. Her father Isodor Ollendorf, was a lawyer and councillor who died in 1911, and her mother Paula spent much of her life working to improve women's rights. The youngest of four siblings, her sister and one brother died young. She attended the University of Freiburg and the Ludwig-Maximilians-Universität München.

== Early career ==
Ollendorff Curth completed her early medical training under Josef Jadassohn, pioneer of patch testing, at the University of Breslau. Together they investigated the sensitivity of secondary syphilitic lesions. She described their findings in her doctoral thesis, for which she was awarded top class honours. Known as the Ollendorff probe sign or Ollendorff sign, the phenomenon referred to deep pain when a syphilitic bump was gently prodded, and was used to help distinguish the lesions of secondary syphilis from similarly looking non-syphilitic ones. (Note: Some publications refer to the sign as the Buschke-Ollendorf sign. However, she described the sign with Jadassohn before going to work with Buschke and the Curths in a memoir to Buschke in 1983 clarify themselves that the sign is called Ollendorffs sign.)

Subsequently, in 1924, she moved to Berlin to train in dermatology at the Rudolf-Virchow-Krankenhaus under Abraham Buschke, and was later appointed his assistant. At the same unit she met her future husband, Rudolf Wilhelm Paul Curth, a dermatologist who had arrived in the department in 1925 as another of Buschke's assistants; they married in 1927. In 1928, with Buschke, she described in one 41-year-old female the connective tissue condition "disseminated dermatofibrosis lenticularis", which came to be known as Buschke–Ollendorff syndrome. Rare and hereditary, they found the disease to present with widespread painless small bumps in the skin, sometimes associated with bone involvement. (Note: Source "Burgdorf (2004)" contains a correction.)

During her time in Berlin, she conducted her early studies on the skin sign acanthosis nigricans (AN).

== Later career ==
In 1931, after witnessing the removal of Jewish looking people by men in uniform, Ollendorff Curth, her husband and child moved to New York City, where they anglicized their names; she removed the final e from Helene and became Helen, and he became William. (Note: Buschke remained and died in a Nazi concentration camp in 1943.) There, they established a private dermatology practice and worked alongside Columbia University.

Her two papers in 1946 contain the first description of cases of Behçet's disease in New York, following which this eponymous term became popular. She described the "triple symptom complex" of ulcers of the mouth and genitals (genital ulcer and mouth ulcer), and eye inflammation leading to hypopyonas, as described by Hulusi Behçet in 1937. Medical professionals have debated whether the disease name should include Benediktos Adamantiades. Ollendorff Curth did not use his name in her title but cites him.

She wrote on diseases that resulted from abnormal skin development, and contributed to Fitzpatrick's Dermatology. In 1954, with Madge Thurlow Macklin, she gave the first description of a rare type of ichthyosis hystrix. The condition presents with thick warty skin, horn-like skin of palms and soles, and scales. She is named for Curth's angle, one form of assessing clubbed fingers, which she published in 1961 in a description of a familial case. In New York she introduced patch testing for industrial employees. At the invitation of Heinrich Adolf Gottron and Urs Walter Schnyder, she contributed a chapter to Jadassohn's Handbook of Skin and Venereal Diseases (1966).

== Cutaneous paraneoplastic syndromes ==
Ollendorff Curth was first to establish a set of criteria required to suspect a cancer when new skin signs appeared. She had initially postulated these characteristics whilst in Berlin, and continued to adapt them. It became known as the "Curth criteria" for associating some rashes and skin conditions as markers for internal cancers. One such skin sign, AN, became a regular topic of her publications. Her definitions and classifications of AN helped to distinguish types associated with cancer (malignant acanthosis nigricans) from benign types with no link to cancer. In 1968 she categorized acanthosis nigricans into four types: malignant, benign, syndromic, and pseudo types. It has since been reclassified by several others. Robert J. Gorlin noted her work in this area to have been a significant influence on him.

== Death ==
Ollendorff Curth died on 17 June 1982, from Alzheimer's disease.

== Selected publications ==
- "Ein Fall von Dermatofibrosis lenticularis disseminata und Osteopathia condensans disseminata". Dermatologische Wochenschrift, Hamburg, 1928, 86: 257–262. (Co-author)
- Curth, Helen Ollendorff (1 October 1934). "Dermatofibrosis lenticularis disseminata and osteopoikilosis". Archives of Dermatology. 30 (4): 552. doi:10.1001/archderm.1934.01460160066009.
- "Benign type of acanthosis nigricans: etiology". Archives of Dermatology and Syphilology. 34 (3): 353–366. 1 September 1936. doi:10.1001/archderm.1936.01470150003001. ISSN 0096-6029.
- Curth, Helen Ollendorff (August 1946). "Recurrent genito-oral aphthosis and uveitis with hypopyon (Behcet's syndrome)". Archives of Dermatology and Syphilology. 54 (2): 179–196. doi:10.1001/archderm.1946.01510370063005. ISSN 0096-6029. PMID 20995035.
- Curth H. O. (October 1946). "Behçet's syndrome, abortive form (?); recurrent aphthous oral lesions and recurrent genital ulcerations". Archives of Dermatology and Syphilology. 54: 481–484. ISSN 0096-6029. PMID 21065219.
- Curth, Helen Ollendorff (1 February 1948). "Acanthosis nigricans and its association with cancer". Archives of Dermatology and Syphilology. 57 (2): 158–170. doi:10.1001/archderm.1948.01520140020003. ISSN 0096-6029. PMID 18912474.
- Curth, Helen Ollendorff; Firschein I. L.; Alpert M. (1 May 1961). "Familial Clubbed Fingers". Archives of Dermatology. 83 (5): 828–836. doi:10.1001/archderm.1961.01580110116017. ISSN 0003-987X. PMID 13718935. (Co-author)
