= Osteopetrosis =

Rare disease of the bones

Adult-onset osteopetrosis
- Other names: Marble bone disease, Albers-Schönberg disease
- X-ray of the pelvis of a patient with osteopetrosis, adult onset form (Albers-Schönberg disease). Note the dense appearance.
- Specialty: Medical genetics

Osteopetrosis, literally 'bone becoming stone', also known as marble bone disease or Albers-Schönberg disease, is an extremely rare inherited disorder whereby the bones harden, becoming denser, in contrast to more prevalent conditions like osteoporosis, in which the bones become less dense and more brittle, or osteomalacia, in which the bones soften. Osteopetrosis can cause bones to dissolve and break.

It is one of the hereditary causes of osteosclerosis. It is considered to be the prototype of osteosclerosing dysplasias. The cause of the disease is understood to be malfunctioning osteoclasts and their inability to resorb bone. Although human osteopetrosis is a heterogeneous disorder encompassing different molecular lesions and a range of clinical features, all forms share a single pathogenic nexus in the osteoclast. The exact molecular defects or location of the mutations taking place are unknown. Osteopetrosis was first described in 1903 by German radiologist Albers-Schönberg.

== Signs and symptoms ==
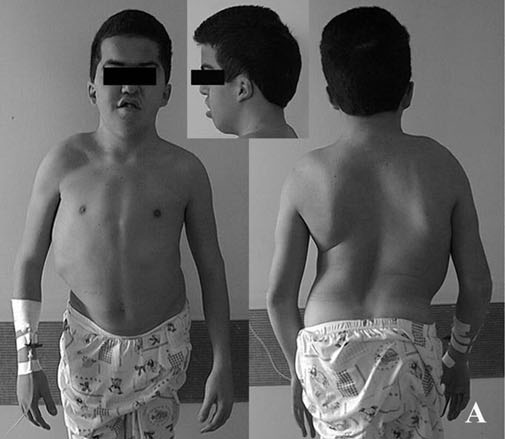
A 17-year-old male with osteopetrosis: Typical cranial deformity and thoracic scoliosis

Despite this excess bone formation, people with osteopetrosis tend to have bones that are more brittle than normal. Mild osteopetrosis may cause no symptoms, and present no problems.

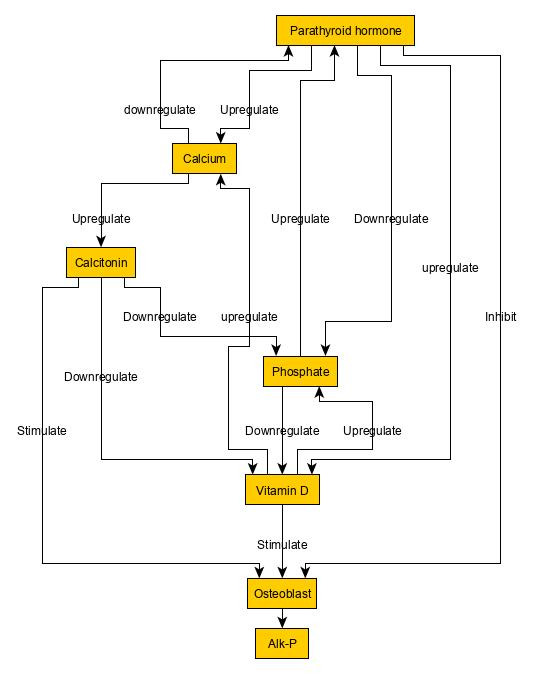
The metabolism of calcium, phosphate, hormones, and Vitamin D

However, serious forms can result in the following:

- Stunted growth, deformity, and increased likelihood of fractures
- Patients experience anemia, recurrent infections, and hepatosplenomegaly due to bone expansion leading to bone marrow narrowing and extramedullary hematopoiesis
- It can also result in blindness, facial paralysis, and deafness, due to the increased pressure put on the nerves by the extra bone
- Abnormal cortical bone morphology
- Abnormal form of the vertebral bodies
- Abnormality of temperature regulation
- Abnormality of the ribs
- Abnormality of vertebral epiphysis morphology
- Bone pain
- Cranial nerve paralysis
- Craniosynostosis
- Hearing impairment
- Hypocalcemia

Comparison of bone pathology
Condition	Calcium	Phosphate	Alkaline phosphatase	Parathyroid hormone	Comments
Osteopenia	unaffected	unaffected	normal	unaffected	decreased bone mass
Osteopetrosis	unaffected	unaffected	elevated	decreased	thick dense bones also known as marble bone
Osteomalacia and rickets	decreased	decreased	elevated	elevated	soft bones
Osteitis fibrosa cystica	elevated	decreased	elevated	elevated	brown tumors
Paget's disease of bone	unaffected	unaffected	variable (depending on stage of disease)	unaffected	abnormal bone architecture

=== Malignant infantile osteopetrosis ===

Autosomal recessive osteopetrosis (ARO), also known as malignant infantile osteopetrosis or infantile malignant osteopetrosis (IMO), is a rare type of skeletal dysplasia characterized by a distinct radiographic pattern of overall increased density of the bones with fundamental involvement of the medullary portion. Infantile osteopetrosis typically manifests in infancy. Diagnosis is principally based on clinical and radiographic evaluation, confirmed by gene analysis where applicable. As a result of medullary canal obliteration and bony expansion, grave pancytopenia, cranial nerve compression, and pathologic fractures may ensue. The prognosis is poor if untreated. The classic radiographic features include endobone or "bone-within-bone" appearance in the spine, pelvis and proximal femora, upper limbs, and short tubular bones of the hand. Additionally, there is the Erlenmeyer flask deformity type 2 which is characterized by the absence of normal diaphyseal metaphysical modeling of the distal femora with abnormal radiographic appearance of trabecular bone and alternating radiolucent metaphyseal bands.

The precise and early diagnosis of infantile osteopetrosis is important for management of complications, genetic counselling, and timely institution of appropriate treatment, namely hematopoietic stem cell transplantation (HSCT), which offers a satisfactory treatment modality for a considerable percentage of infantile osteopetrosis. Amelioration of radiographic bone lesions after HSCT in infantile osteopetrosis has been proposed as an important indicator of success of the therapy. A few publications with limited study participants have demonstrated the resolution of skeletal radiographic pathology following HSCT.

=== Adult osteopetrosis ===
Autosomal dominant osteopetrosis (ADO) is also known as Albers-Schönberg disease. Most do not know they have this disorder because most individuals do not show any symptoms. However, those who do show symptoms will typically have a curvature of the spine (scoliosis) and multiple bone fractures. There are two types of adult osteopetrosis based on the basis of radiographic, biochemical, and clinical features.

Characteristic	Type I	Type II
Skull sclerosis	Marked sclerosis mainly of the vault	Sclerosis mainly of the base
Spine	Does not show signs of sclerosis	Shows the sandwich appearance
Pelvis	No endobones	Shows endobones in the pelvis
Risk of fracture	Low	High
Serum acid phosphate	Normal	Very high

Many patients will have bone pains. The defects are very common and include neuropathies due to cranial nerve entrapment, osteoarthritis, and carpal tunnel syndrome. About 40% of patients will experience recurrent fractures of their bones. 10% of patients will have osteomyelitis of the mandible.

== Causes ==
The various types of osteopetrosis are caused by genetic changes (mutations) in one of at least ten genes. There is nothing a parent can do before, during or after a pregnancy to cause osteopetrosis in a child.

Normally, bone growth is a balance between osteoblasts (cells that create bone tissue) and osteoclasts (cells that destroy bone tissue). This process is necessary to keep bones strong and healthy. Those with osteopetrosis have a deficiency of osteoclasts, meaning too little bone is being resorbed, resulting in too much bone being created. The genes associated with osteopetrosis are involved in the development and/or function of osteoclasts, cells that break down bone tissue when old bone is being replaced by new bone (bone remodeling). Mutations in these genes can lead to abnormal osteoclasts(termed osteoclast-rich osteopetrosis), or having too few osteoclasts(osteoclast-poor osteopetrosis). If this happens, old bone cannot be broken down as new bone is formed, so bones become too dense and prone to breaking.

Three different types of inheritance-autosomal dominant, autosomal recessive and X-linked recessive have been observed.

- Mutations in the CLCN7 gene cause most cases of autosomal dominant(in a dominant negative manner) osteopetrosis, 10-15% of cases of autosomal recessive osteopetrosis (the most severe form), and all known cases of intermediate autosomal osteopetrosis.
- Mutations in the TCIRG1 gene cause about 50% of cases of AR(autosomal recessive) osteopetrosis.
- Mutations in the IKBKG gene cause X-linked osteopetrosis.
- Mutations in the CA-II gene can be an extremely rare cause of AR osteopetrosis in the setting of renal defects.
- Mutations in the RANKL gene cause AR osteoclast-poor osteopetrosis.
- Mutations in other genes are less common causes of osteopetrosis.
- In about 30% of affected people, the cause is unknown.

=== Gene variation ===
Name	OMIM	Gene
OPTA1	607634	LRP5 receptor
OPTA2	166600	CLCN7 chloride channel
OPTB1	259700	TCIRG1 ATPase
OPTB2	259710	RANKL
OPTB3	259730	CA2 (renal tubular acidosis)
OPTB4	611490	CLCN7 chloride channel
OPTB5	259720	OSTM1 ubiquitin ligase
OPTB6	611497	PLEKHM1 adapter protein
OPTB7	612301	TNFRSF11A (RANK receptor)

== Mechanisms ==
Normal bone growth is achieved by a balance between bone formation by osteoblasts and bone resorption (breakdown of bone matrix) by osteoclasts. In osteopetrosis, the number of osteoclasts may be reduced, normal, or increased. Most importantly, osteoclast dysfunction mediates the pathogenesis of this disease.

Osteopetrosis can be caused by underlying mutations that interfere with the acidification of the osteoclast resorption pit, for example due to a deficiency of the carbonic anhydrase enzyme encoded by the CA2 gene. Carbonic anhydrase is required by osteoclasts for proton production. Without this enzyme hydrogen ion pumping is inhibited and bone resorption by osteoclasts is defective, as an acidic environment is needed to dissociate calcium hydroxyapatite from the bone matrix. As bone resorption fails while bone formation continues, excessive bone is formed.

Mutations in any of the genes associated with osteopetrosis lead to abnormal or missing osteoclasts. Without functional osteoclasts, old bone is not broken down as new bone is formed. As a result, bones throughout the skeleton become unusually dense. The bones are also structurally abnormal, making them prone to fracture. These problems with bone remodeling underlie all of the major features of osteopetrosis.

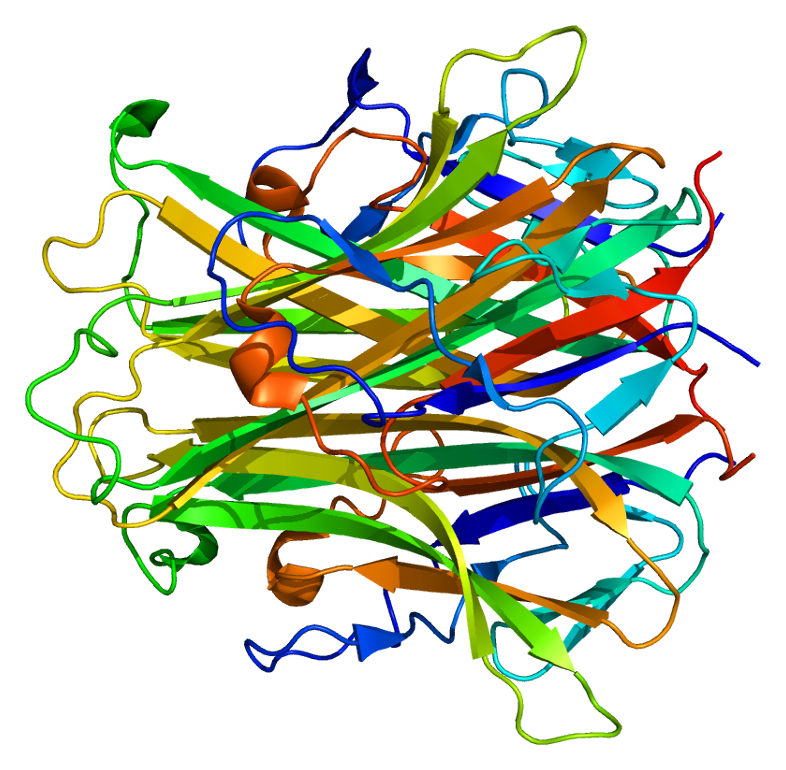
Protein TNFSF 11(RANKL)

== Diagnosis ==
The differential diagnosis of osteopetrosis includes other disorders that produce osteosclerosis. They constitute a wide array of disorders with clinically and radiologically diverse manifestations. Among the differential diagnoses are hereditary osteosclerosing dysplasias such as neuropathic infantile osteopetrosis, infantile osteopetrosis with renal tubular acidosis, infantile osteopetrosis with immunodeficiency, infantile osteopetrosis with leukocyte adhesion deficiency syndrome (LAD-III), pyknodysostosis (osteopetrosis acro-osteolytica), osteopoikilosis (Buschke–Ollendorff syndrome), osteopathia striata with cranial sclerosis, mixed sclerosing skeletal dysplasias, progressive diaphyseal dysplasia (Camurati–Engelmann disease), and SOST-related sclerosing skeletal dysplasias. Besides, the differential diagnosis includes acquired conditions that induce osteosclerosis such as osteosclerotic metastasis notably carcinomas of the prostate gland and breast, Paget's disease of bone, myelofibrosis (primary disorder or secondary to intoxication or malignancy), Erdheim–Chester disease, osteosclerosing types of osteomyelitis, sickle cell disease, hypervitaminosis D, and hypoparathyroidism.

== Treatment ==
It was the first genetic disease treated with hematopoietic stem cell transplantation (osteoclasts are derived from hematopoietic precursors). There is no cure, although curative therapy with bone marrow transplantation is being investigated in clinical trials. It is believed the healthy marrow will provide cells from which osteoclasts will develop. If complications occur in children, patients can be treated with vitamin D. Gamma interferon has also been shown to be effective, and it can be associated with vitamin D. Erythropoietin has been used to treat any associated anemia. Corticosteroids may both alleviate the anemia and stimulate bone resorption. Fractures and osteomyelitis can be treated as usual. Treatment for osteopetrosis depends on the specific symptoms present and the severity in each person. Therefore, treatment options must be evaluated on an individual basis. Nutritional support is important to improve growth and it also enhances responsiveness to other treatment options. A calcium-deficient diet has been beneficial for some affected people.

Treatment is necessary for the infantile form:

- Vitamin D (calcitriol) appears to stimulate dormant osteoclasts, which stimulates bone resorption
- Gamma interferon can have long-term benefits. It improves white blood cell function (leading to fewer infections), decreases bone volume, and increases bone marrow volume.
- Erythropoietin can be used for anemia, and corticosteroids can be used for anemia and to stimulate bone resorption.

Bone marrow transplantation (BMT) improves some cases of severe, infantile osteopetrosis associated with bone marrow failure, and offers the best chance of longer-term survival for individuals with this type.

In pediatric (childhood) osteopetrosis, surgery is sometimes needed because of fractures. Adult osteopetrosis typically does not require treatment, but complications of the condition may require intervention. Surgery may be needed for aesthetic or functional reasons (such as multiple fractures, deformity, and loss of function), or for severe degenerative joint disease.

== Prognosis ==
The long-term outlook for people with osteopetrosis depends on the subtype and the severity of the condition in each person. The severe infantile forms of osteopetrosis are associated with shortened life expectancy, with most untreated children not surviving past their first decade. Bone marrow transplantation seems to have cured some infants with early-onset disease. However, the long-term prognosis after transplantation is unknown. For those with onset in childhood or adolescence, the effect of the condition depends on the specific symptoms (including how fragile the bones are and how much pain is present). Life expectancy in the adult-onset forms is normal.

== Prevalence ==
Approximately eight to 40 children are born in the United States each year with the malignant infantile type of osteopetrosis. One in every 100,000 to 500,000 individuals is born with this form of osteopetrosis. Higher rates have been found in Denmark and Costa Rica. Males and females are affected in equal numbers.

The adult type of osteopetrosis affects about 1,250 individuals in the United States. One in every 200,000 individuals is affected by the adult type of osteopetrosis. Higher rates have been found in Brazil. Males and females are affected in equal numbers.

Osteopetrosis affects one newborn out of every 20,000 to 250,000 worldwide, but the odds are much higher in the Russian region of Chuvashia (1 of every 3,500–4,000 newborns) due to genetic traits of the Chuvash people.

== Recent research ==
Recent research demonstrated that the systematic administration of RANKL for one month to Rankl(-/-) mice, which closely resemble the human disease, significantly improved the bone phenotype and has beneficial effects on bone marrow, spleen and thymus; major adverse effects arise only when mice are clearly overtreated. Overall, it provided evidence that the pharmacological administration of RANKL represents the appropriate treatment option for RANKL-deficient ARO patients, to be validated in a pilot clinical trial.

Interferon gamma-1b is FDA-approved to delay the time to disease progression in patients with severe, malignant osteopetrosis.

== Notable cases ==
- Laurel Burch
- Henri de Toulouse-Lautrec (osteopetrosis was at one time thought to be what he suffered from, but it was later discovered to be pycnodysostosis)

== Bibliography ==
- Penna, Sara; Capo, Valentina; Palagano, Eleonora; Sobacchi, Cristina; Villa, Anna (19 February 2019). "One Disease, Many Genes: Implications for the Treatment of Osteopetroses". Frontiers in Endocrinology. 10 85. doi:10.3389/fendo.2019.00085. PMC 6389615. PMID 30837952.
- Susani, Lucia; Pangrazio, Alessandra; Sobacchi, Cristina; Taranta, Anna; Mortier, Geert; Savarirayan, Ravi; Villa, Anna; Orchard, Paul; Vezzoni, Paolo; Albertini, Alberto; Frattini, Annalisa; Pagani, Franco (September 2004). "TCIRG1-dependent recessive osteopetrosis: Mutation analysis, functional identification of the splicing defects, andin vitro rescue by U1 snRNA". Human Mutation. 24 (3): 225–235. doi:10.1002/humu.20076. PMID 15300850. S2CID 31788054.
- GeneReviews/NCBI/NIH/UW entry on CLCN7-Related Osteopetrosis
