= Abraham Buschke =

German dermatologist (1868–1943)

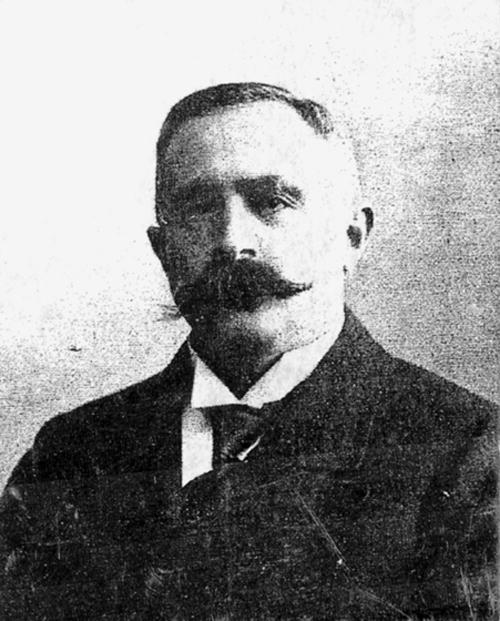
Abraham Buschke (1868–1943)

Abraham Buschke (27 September 1868 – 25 February 1943) was a Jewish German dermatologist who was a native of Nakel in the Province of Posen.

== Life ==
In 1891 he received his doctorate in Berlin, and afterwards was a surgical assistant in Greifswald. Later he worked at dermatological clinics in Breslau under Albert Neisser (1855–1916) and in Berlin with Edmund Lesser (1852–1918). In 1906 he became head of dermatology at Rudolf Virchow Hospital in Wedding.

In 1943 he died in the Nazi concentration camp at Theresienstadt, Bohemia.

== Work ==
Abraham Buschke specialized in research of venereal disease. In 1926 with Martin Gumpert (1897–1955) he published a treatise on syphilis in children titled Geschlechtskrankheiten bei Kindern (Venereal Diseases in Children). His name is associated with several eponymous dermatological disorders, including:

- Buschke's scleredema: Hardening and thickening of the skin, usually on the upper back, neck, shoulders and face. Its etiology is unknown, but it is often associated with diabetes.
- Buschke–Löwenstein tumor: Also known as giant condyloma acuminatum; a variety of venereal wart characterized by its large, cauliflower-like appearance. Named with Ludwig Loewenstein (1885–1959).
- Buschke–Ollendorff syndrome: Also called disseminated lenticular dermatofibrosis. Named with dermatologist Helene Ollendorff Curth.

In 1894 with pathologist Otto Busse (1867–1922) Buschke described an infectious disease caused by the fungus Cryptococcus neoformans. This condition is sometimes referred to as Busse–Buschke disease.
