= Ichthyosis hystrix =

- Specialty: Dermatology

Ichthyosis hystrix is a group of rare skin disorders in the ichthyosis family of skin disorders characterized by massive hyperkeratosis with an appearance like spiny scales. This term is also used to refer to a type of epidermal nevi with extensive bilateral distribution.

== Types ==
=== Ichthyosis hystrix, Curth-Macklin type ===
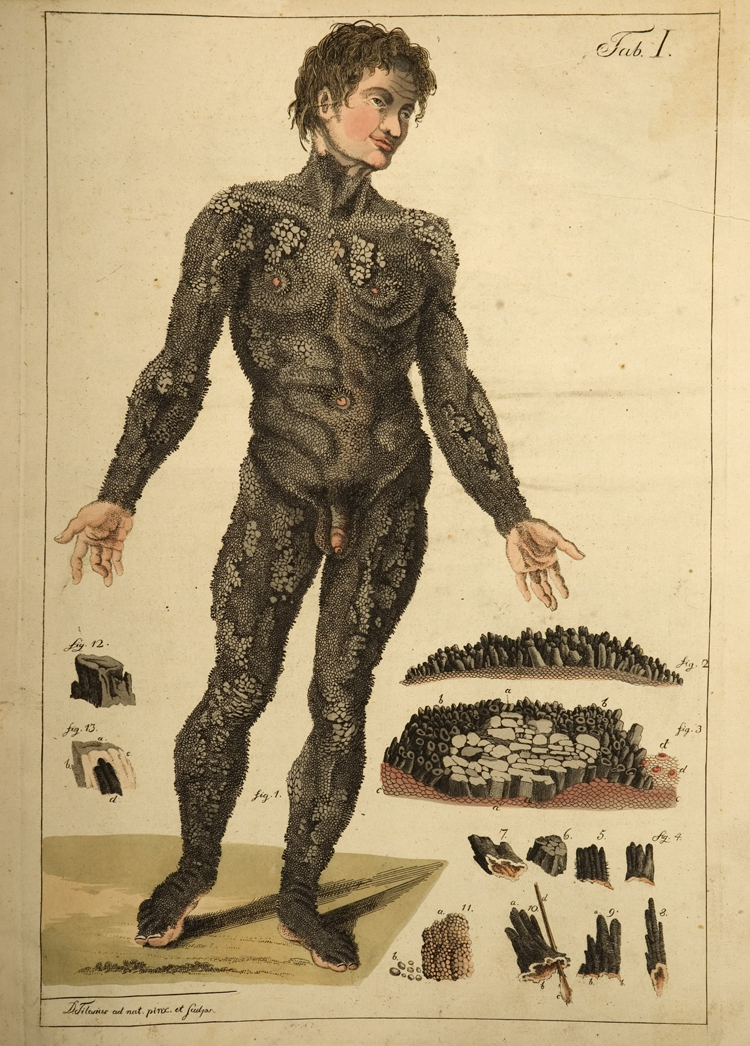
Edward Lambert, an Englishman who had ichthyosis hystrix.

The symptoms of ichthyosis hystrix Curth-Macklin are similar to epidermolytic hyperkeratosis (NPS-2 type) but there is no blistering and the hyperkeratosis is verrucous or spine-like. The hyperkeratosis is brown-grey in colour and is most obvious on the arms and legs. It is an autosomal dominant condition and can be caused by errors to the KRT1 gene. It is named after Helene Ollendorff Curth (1899-1982), a German-Jewish dermatologist, and Madge Thurlow Macklin (1893–1962), an American medical geneticist, and is one of the first syndromes named after two women.

=== Ichthyosis hystrix, Lambert type ===
Also known as ichthyosis hystrix gravior or porcupine man. This disease is characterised by spiny scales which cover the entire body except the face, genitals, palms and soles. The only known cases were in Edward Lambert (known as the porcupine man) who was exhibited in front of the Royal Society in London in 1731 and three generations of his descendants. No cases of this disease are now known though some experts believe that it may have been a type of epidermolytic hyperkeratosis. From the history of the Lambert family the disease appears to have been an autosomal dominant condition.

=== Hystrix-like ichthyosis with deafness syndrome ===
HID syndrome is also known as ichthyosis hystrix, Rheydt type after the German city of Rheydt near Düsseldorf where it was first discovered. Symptoms are bilateral hearing loss and spiky hyperkeratotic masses which cover the whole body though the palms and soles are less badly affected. It can be differentiated from KID syndrome which also has symptoms of deafness and ichthyosis by the different distribution of hyperkeratosis. It is an autosomal dominant condition caused by a mutation to the GJB2 gene (the same gene affected by KID syndrome).

=== Ichthyosis hystrix, Baefvertstedt type ===
An extremely rare disease of which only a few isolated cases are known.

== See also ==
- List of cutaneous conditions
- List of cutaneous conditions caused by mutations in keratins
- List of radiographic findings associated with cutaneous conditions
