= Senter syndrome =

- Other names: Desmons' syndrome
- Specialty: Dermatology

Senter syndrome is a cutaneous condition characterized by similar skin changes and congenital hearing impairment to keratitis–ichthyosis–deafness syndrome, but is associated with glycogen storage leading to hepatomegaly, hepatic cirrhosis, growth failure and intellectual disability.

== See also ==
- HID syndrome
- List of cutaneous conditions
