= Oskar Simon =

German dermatologist

Oskar Simon (2 January 1845 – 2 March 1882) was a German dermatologist who was a native of Berlin.

He studied medicine in Berlin, where he earned his doctorate in 1868. He furthered his education in Vienna, where he took classes from Ferdinand von Hebra (1816-1880) and Hermann Edler von Zeissl (1817-1884). During the Franco-Prussian War he was an assistant-surgeon, and in 1872 became a lecturer of skin diseases and syphilis in Berlin.

In 1878 he succeeded Heinrich Koebner (1838-1904) as professor of dermatology at the University of Breslau, and also became chief physician at Allerheiligen Hospital. Among his students were Albert Neisser (1855-1916), Edmund Lesser (1852-1918) and Eduard Arning (1855-1936). Oskar Simon died from carcinoma of the stomach on 2 March 1882 at the age of 37.

== Selected publications ==
- Zur Anatomie des Xanthoma palpebrarum, 1872 (with E. Geber) - On the anatomy of xanthoma palpebrarum.
- Die Localisation der Hautkrankheiten, Histologisch und Klinisch Bearbeitet, 1873 - Localization of skin diseases, histologically and clinically analyzed.
- Ueber das Molluscum Contagiosum, 1876 - On molluscum contagiosum.
- Ueber multiple, kachektische Hautgangrän, 1878 - On multiple, cachetic gangrene of the skin.
- Ueber Prurigo und die Behandlung Derselben mit Pilocarpin, 1879 - On prurigo and treatment with pilocarpine.
- Ueber die Einführung der animalen Vaccine, 1879 - On the introduction of animal vaccine.
- Ueber Maculae coeruleae (Taches ombrées, taches bleues), 1881 - On maculae caeruleae (shaded spots, blue spots)
- Ueber Balanopostho-Mykosis, 1881 - On balanopostho-mycosis.
