= Melorheostosis =

Thickening of the bones

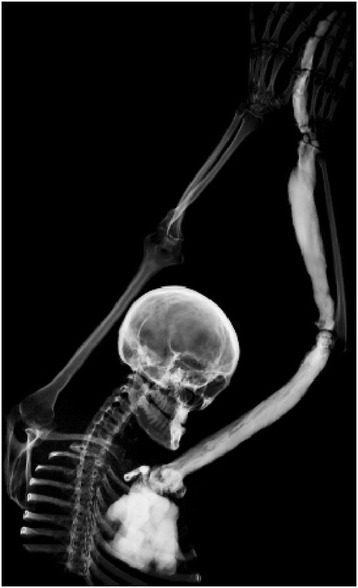
- Specialty: Rheumatology

Melorheostosis is a medical developmental disorder and mesenchymal dysplasia in which the bony cortex widens and becomes hyperdense in a sclerotomal distribution. The condition ends in childhood and is characterized by thickening of the bones. Pain is a frequent symptom and the bone can have the appearance of dripping candle wax.

== Cause ==
A randomly occurring somatic mutation of the MAP2K1 gene during fetal development is believed to be the cause. It is not known if LEMD3 mutations can cause isolated melorheostosis in the absence of osteopoikilosis or Buschke–Ollendorff syndrome.

== Diagnosis ==
Melorheostosis is a mesenchymal dysplasia manifesting as regions of dripping wax appearance or flowing candle wax appearance. The disorder can be detected by radiograph due to thickening of bony cortex resembling "dripping candle wax." It is included on the spectrum of developmental bone dysplasias including pycnodysostosis and osteopoikilosis. The disorder tends to be unilateral and monostotic (i.e. affecting a single bone), with only one limb typically involved. Cases with involvement of multiple limbs, ribs, and bones in the spine have also been reported. There are no reported cases of involvement of skull or facial bones. Melorheostosis can be associated with pain, physical deformity, skin and circulation problems, contractures, and functional limitation. It is also associated with a benign inner ear dysplasia known as osteosclerosis.

== Treatment ==
The disorder is progressive, with the ultimate severity of symptoms often depending on age of onset. In severe cases amputation has been performed when conservative measures such as physical therapy and regional anesthetics have been ineffective.

== See also ==
- List of radiographic findings associated with cutaneous conditions
