= Osteosclerosis =

Condition in which bones are abnormally hardened

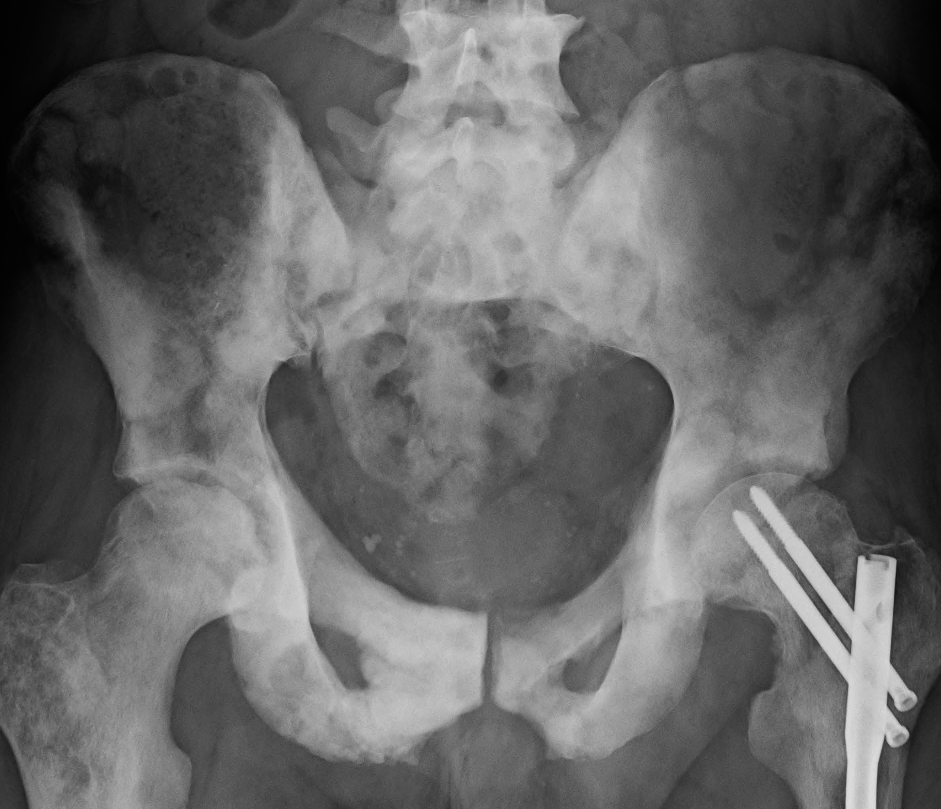
- Sclerosis of the bones of the pelvis due to prostate cancer metastases
- Specialty: Medical genetics

Osteosclerosis is a disorder characterized by abnormal hardening of bone and an elevation in bone density. It may predominantly affect the medullary portion and/or cortex of bone. Plain radiographs are a valuable tool for detecting and classifying osteosclerotic disorders. It can manifest in localized or generalized osteosclerosis. Localized osteosclerosis can be caused by Legg–Calvé–Perthes disease, sickle-cell disease and osteoarthritis among others. Osteosclerosis can be classified in accordance with the causative factor into acquired and hereditary.

== Types ==
=== Acquired osteosclerosis ===
- Osteogenic bone metastasis caused by carcinoma of prostate and breast
- Paget's disease of bone
- Myelofibrosis (primary disorder or secondary to intoxication or malignancy)
- Osteosclerosing types of chronic osteomyelitis
- Hypervitaminosis D
- Hyperparathyroidism
- Schnitzler syndrome
- Mastocytosis
- Skeletal fluorosis
- Monoclonal IgM Kappa cryoglobulinemia
- Hepatitis C.

=== Hereditary osteosclerosis ===
- Malignant infantile osteopetrosis
- Neuropathic infantile osteopetrosis
- Infantile osteopetrosis with renal tubular acidosis
- Infantile osteopetrosis with immunodeficiency
- IO with leukocyte adhesion deficiency syndrome (LAD-III)
- Intermediate osteopetrosis
- Autosomal dominant osteopetrosis (Albers-Schonberg)
- Pyknodysostosis (osteopetrosis acro-osteolytica)
- Osteopoikilosis (Buschke–Ollendorff syndrome)
- Osteopathia striata with cranial sclerosis
- Mixed sclerosing bone dysplasia
- Progressive diaphyseal dysplasia (Camurati–Engelmann disease)
- SOST-related sclerosing bone dysplasias
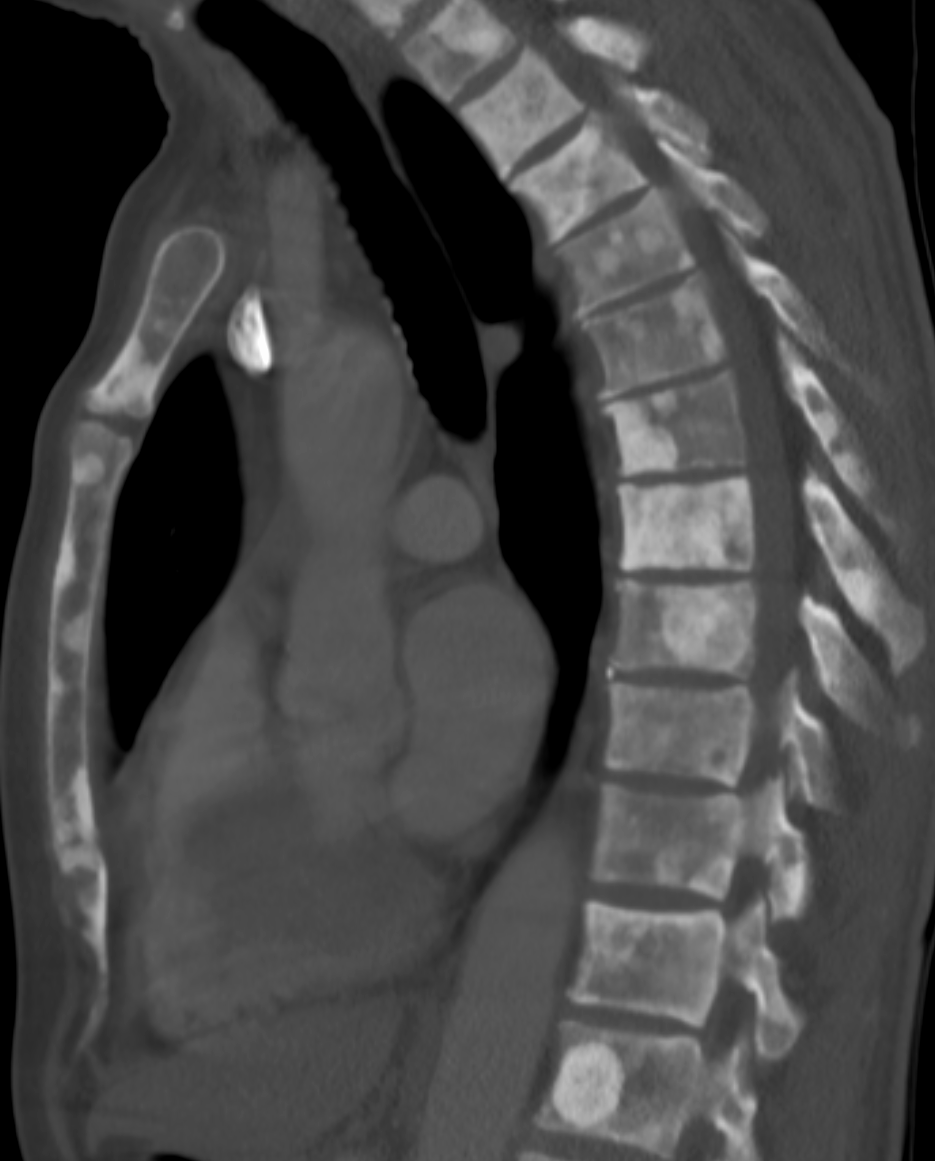
Sclerosis of the bones of the thoracic spine due to prostate cancer metastases (CT image)

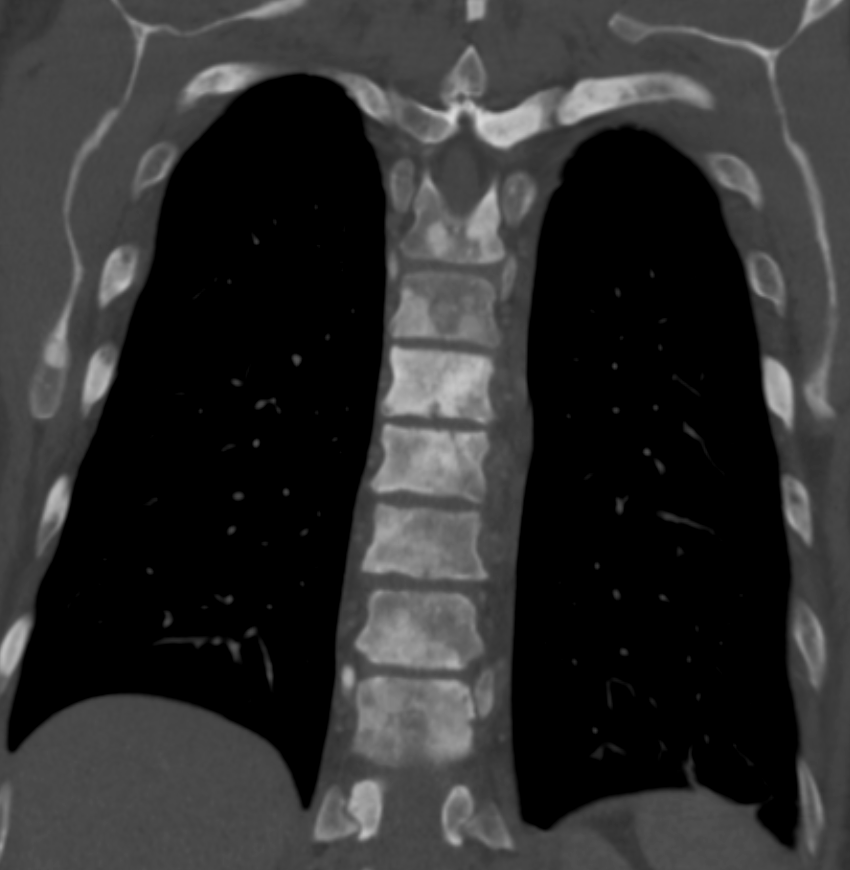
Sclerosis of the bones of the thoracic spine due to prostate cancer metastases (CT image)

== Diagnosis ==
Osteosclerosis can be detected with a simple radiography. There are white portions of the bone which appear due to the increased number of bone trabeculae.

== Animals ==
In the animal kingdom, there also exists a non-pathological form of osteosclerosis, resulting in unusually solid bone structure with little to no marrow. It is often seen in aquatic vertebrates, especially those living in shallow waters, providing ballast as an adaptation for an aquatic lifestyle. It makes bones heavier, but also more fragile. In those animal groups, osteosclerosis often occurs together with bone thickening (pachyostosis). This joint occurrence is called pachyosteosclerosis.

== See also ==
- Axial osteomalacia
- Pachyostosis
- Pachyosteosclerosis
- Heinrich Albers-Schönberg
