= Jadassohn =

Jadassohn is a surname. Notable people with the surname include:

- Josef Jadassohn (1863–1936), German dermatologist
- Salomon Jadassohn (1831–1902), German pianist, composer, and teacher
