= Pachyostosis =

Condition in which bones have an abnormally elevated density

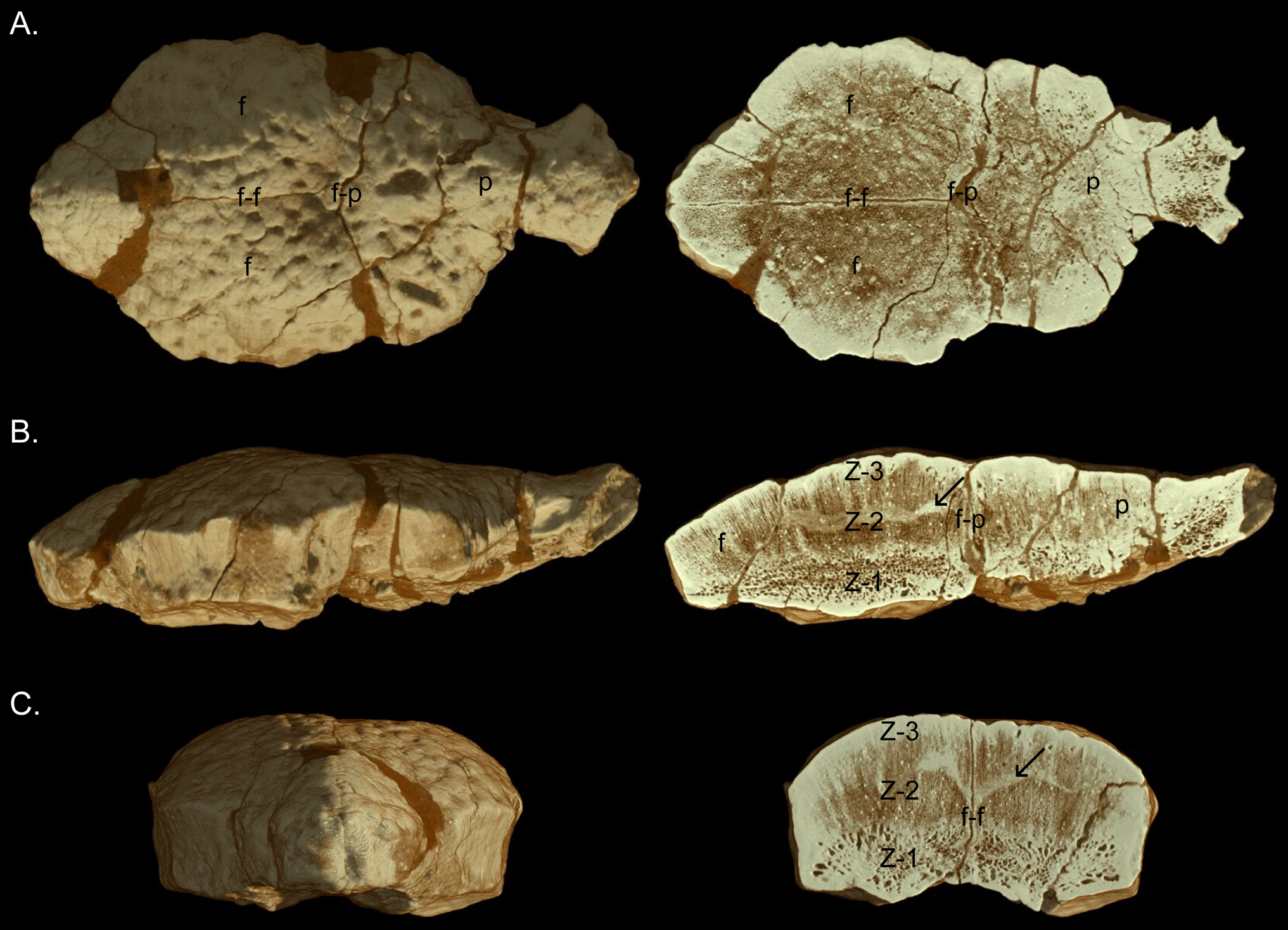
Skull dome of Stegoceras (AMNH 5450) showing cross-section thickness

Pachyostosis is a non-pathological condition in vertebrate animals in which the bones experience a thickening, generally caused by extra layers of lamellar bone. It often occurs together with bone densification (osteosclerosis), reducing inner cavities. This joint occurrence is called pachyosteosclerosis. However, especially in the older literature, "pachyostosis" is often used loosely, referring to all osseous specializations characterized by an increase in bone compactness and/or volume. It occurs in both terrestrial and, especially, aquatic or semi-aquatic vertebrates.

In aquatic animals, such as seacows (manatees and dugongs), Thalassocnus, and plesiosaurs, pachyostosis in the thoracic region provides (or provided) ballast against the air-filled lungs. This maintains neutral buoyancy in aquatic habitats.

Most giant deer showed pronounced pachyostosis of the mandible and skull. It has been suggested that this served to store minerals for antler growth. Many Pachycephalosauria and most members of the Dinocephalia clade of therapsids had thickened skull bones, probably used in head-butting contests.

== See also ==
- Osteosclerosis
- Pachyosteosclerosis
