= Carbonic anhydrase 2 =

Enzyme found in humans

CA2
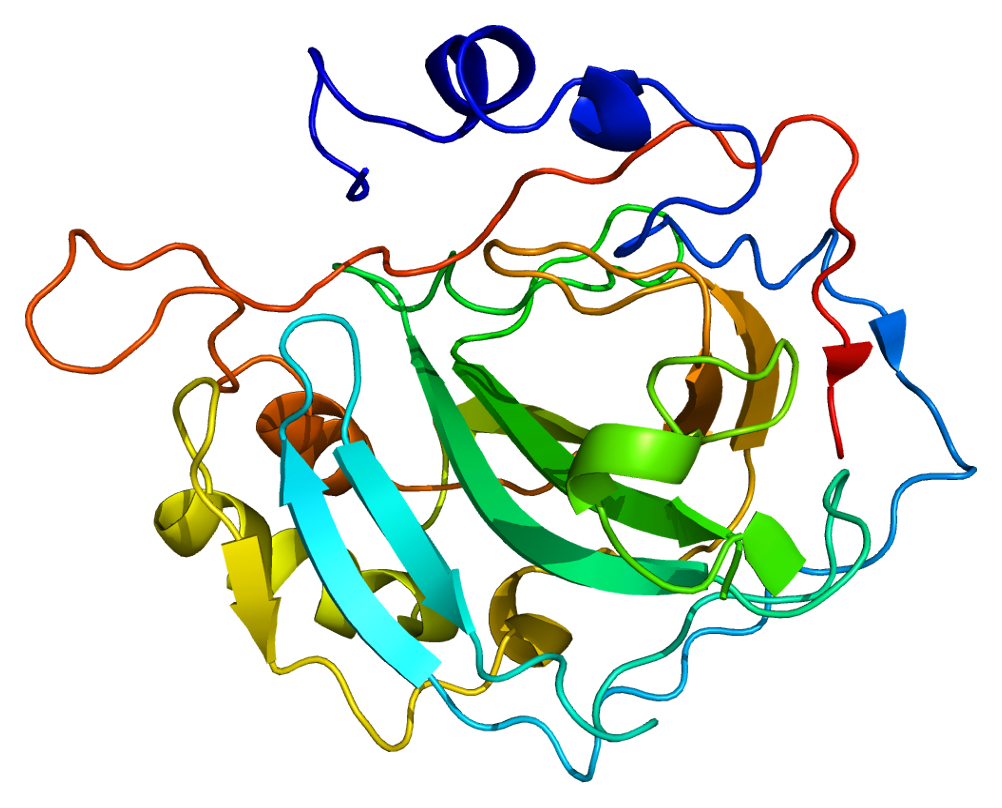

Identifiers
- Aliases: CA2, CA-II, CAC, CAII, Car2, HEL-76, HEL-S-282, Carbonic anhydrase II, carbonic anhydrase 2
- External IDs: OMIM: 611492; MGI: 88269; GeneCards: CA2
Available structures
PDB	Ortholog search: PDBe RCSB
PDB	List of PDB id codes 12CA, 1A42, 1AM6, 1AVN, 1BCD, 1BIC, 1BN1, 1BN3, 1BN4, 1BNM, 1BNN, 1BNQ, 1BNT, 1BNU, 1BNV, 1BNW, 1BV3, 1CA2, 1CA3, 1CAH, 1CAI, 1CAJ, 1CAK, 1CAL, 1CAM, 1CAN, 1CAO, 1CAY, 1CAZ, 1CCS, 1CCT, 1CCU, 1CIL, 1CIM, 1CIN, 1CNB, 1CNC, 1CNG, 1CNH, 1CNI, 1CNJ, 1CNK, 1CNW, 1CNX, 1CNY, 1CRA, 1CVA, 1CVB, 1CVC, 1CVD, 1CVE, 1CVF, 1CVH, 1DCA, 1DCB, 1EOU, 1F2W, 1FQL, 1FQM, 1FQN, 1FQR, 1FR4, 1FR7, 1FSN, 1FSQ, 1FSR, 1G0E, 1G0F, 1G1D, 1G3Z, 1G45, 1G46, 1G48, 1G4J, 1G4O, 1G52, 1G53, 1G54, 1H4N, 1H9N, 1H9Q, 1HCA, 1HEA, 1HEB, 1HEC, 1HED, 1HVA, 1I8Z, 1I90, 1I91, 1I9L, 1I9M, 1I9N, 1I9O, 1I9P, 1I9Q, 1IF4, 1IF5, 1IF6, 1IF7, 1IF8, 1IF9, 1KWQ, 1KWR, 1LG5, 1LG6, 1LGD, 1LUG, 1LZV, 1MOO, 1MUA, 1OKL, 1OKM, 1OKN, 1OQ5, 1RAY, 1RAZ, 1RZA, 1RZB, 1RZC, 1RZD, 1RZE, 1T9N, 1TB0, 1TBT, 1TE3, 1TEQ, 1TEU, 1TG3, 1TG9, 1TH9, 1THK, 1TTM, 1UGA, 1UGB, 1UGC, 1UGD, 1UGE, 1UGF, 1UGG, 1XEG, 1XEV, 1XPZ, 1XQ0, 1YDA, 1YDB, 1YDC, 1YDD, 1YO0, 1YO1, 1YO2, 1Z9Y, 1ZE8, 1ZFK, 1ZFQ, 1ZGE, 1ZGF, 1ZH9, 1ZSA, 1ZSB, 1ZSC, 2ABE, 2AW1, 2AX2, 2CA2, 2CBA, 2CBB, 2CBC, 2CBD, 2CBE, 2EU2, 2EU3, 2EZ7, 2F14, 2FMG, 2FMZ, 2FNK, 2FNM, 2FNN, 2FOQ, 2FOS, 2FOU, 2FOV, 2GD8, 2GEH, 2H15, 2H4N, 2HD6, 2HKK, 2HL4, 2HNC, 2HOC, 2ILI, 2NNG, 2NNO, 2NNS, 2NNV, 2NWO, 2NWP, 2NWY, 2NWZ, 2NXR, 2NXS, 2NXT, 2O4Z, 2OSF, 2OSM, 2POU, 2POV, 2POW, 2Q1B, 2Q1Q, 2Q38, 2QO8, 2QOA, 2QP6, 2VVA, 2VVB, 2WD2, 2WD3, 2WEG, 2WEH, 2WEJ, 2WEO, 2X7S, 2X7T, 2X7U, 3B4F, 3BET, 3BL0, 3BL1, 3C7P, 3CA2, 3CAJ, 3CYU, 3D8W, 3D92, 3D93, 3D9Z, 3DAZ, 3DBU, 3DC3, 3DC9, 3DCC, 3DCS, 3DCW, 3DD0, 3DD8, 3DV7, 3DVB, 3DVC, 3DVD, 3EFI, 3EFT, 3F4X, 3F8E, 3FFP, 3GZ0, 3HFP, 3HKN, 3HKQ, 3HKT, 3HKU, 3HLJ, 3HS4, 3IBI, 3IBL, 3IBN, 3IBU, 3IEO, 3IGP, 3K2F, 3K34, 3K7K, 3KIG, 3KKX, 3KNE, 3KOI, 3KOK, 3KON, 3KS3, 3KWA, 3L14, 3M04, 3M14, 3M1J, 3M1K, 3M1Q, 3M1W, 3M2N, 3M2X, 3M2Y, 3M2Z, 3M3X, 3M40, 3M5E, 3M5S, 3M5T, 3M67, 3M96, 3M98, 3MHC, 3MHI, 3MHL, 3MHM, 3MHO, 3ML2, 3MMF, 3MNA, 3MNH, 3MNI, 3MNJ, 3MNK, 3MNU, 3MWO, 3MYQ, 3MZC, 3N0N, 3N2P, 3N3J, 3N4B, 3NB5, 3NI5, 3NJ9, 3OIK, 3OIL, 3OIM, 3OKU, 3OKV, 3OY0, 3OYQ, 3OYS, 3P3H, 3P3J, 3P44, 3P4V, 3P55, 3P58, 3P5A, 3P5L, 3PJJ, 3PO6, 3PYK, 3QYK, 3R16, 3R17, 3RG3, 3RG4, 3RGE, 3RJ7, 3RLD, 3RYJ, 3RYV, 3RYX, 3RYY, 3RYZ, 3RZ0, 3RZ1, 3RZ5, 3RZ7, 3RZ8, 3S71, 3S72, 3S73, 3S74, 3S75, 3S76, 3S77, 3S78, 3S8X, 3S9T, 3SAP, 3SAX, 3SBH, 3SBI, 3T5U, 3T5Z, 3T82, 3T83, 3T84, 3T85, 3TMJ, 3TVN, 3TVO, 3U3A, 3U45, 3U47, 3U7C, 3V2J, 3V2M, 3V3F, 3V3G, 3V3H, 3V3I, 3V3J, 3V5G, 3V7X, 3VBD, 3ZP9, 4BCW, 4BF1, 4BF6, 4CA2, 4CAC, 4CQ0, 4DZ7, 4DZ9, 4E3D, 4E3F, 4E3G, 4E3H, 4E49, 4E4A, 4E5Q, 4FIK, 4FL7, 4FPT, 4FRC, 4FU5, 4FVN, 4FVO, 4G0C, 4GL1, 4HBA, 4HEW, 4HEY, 4HEZ, 4HF3, 4HT0, 4IDR, 4ILX, 4ITO, 4ITP, 4IWZ, 4JS6, 4JSA, 4JSS, 4JSW, 4JSZ, 4K0S, 4K0T, 4K0Z, 4K13, 4K1Q, 4KAP, 4KNI, 4KNJ, 4KUV, 4KUW, 4KUY, 4KV0, 4L5U, 4L5V, 4L5W, 4LHI, 4LP6, 4M2R, 4M2U, 4M2V, 4M2W, 4MDG, 4MDL, 4MDM, 4MLT, 4MLX, 4MO8, 4MTY, 4N0X, 4N16, 4PQ7, 4PXX, 4PYX, 4PYY, 4PZH, 4Q06, 4Q07, 4Q08, 4Q09, 4Q49, 4Q6D, 4Q6E, 4Q78, 4Q7P, 4Q7S, 4Q7V, 4Q7W, 4Q81, 4Q83, 4Q87, 4Q8X, 4Q8Y, 4Q8Z, 4Q90, 4Q99, 4Q9Y, 4QEF, 4QIY, 4QJM, 4QK1, 4QK2, 4QK3, 4QSA, 4QSB, 4QSI, 4QTL, 4QY3, 4R59, 4R5A, 4R5B, 4RFC, 4RFD, 4RIU, 4RIV, 4RN4, 4RUX, 4RUY, 4RUZ, 4WW6, 4XE1, 4Y0J, 4YGJ, 4YGK, 4YGL, 4YGN, 4Z0Q, 4Z1E, 4Z1J, 4Z1K, 4Z1N, 4ZWI, 4ZWY, 4ZWZ, 5AMD, 5AMG, 5AML, 5BNL, 5BRU, 5BRV, 5BRW, 5BYI, 5CA2, 5CAC, 6CA2, 7CA2, 8CA2, 9CA2, 5E2S, 4YXO, 5CLU, 4YXU, 5EKJ, 5EKH, 1G6V, 5EKM, 4ZX1, 5E2K, 4YYT, 4WL4, 4ZAO, 4ZX0, 4YX4, 4RH2, 4YWP, 4YXI, 5E28, 5E2R, 4ZWX, 5FLT, 5FNH, 5FNJ, 5FLR, 5EH5, 5FLS, 5EHW, 5FNG, 5EH8, 5EHV, 5FNI, 5FNM, 5FNK, 5EH7, 5FLQ, 5FLP, 5FLO, 5DSN, 5DSP, 5J8Z, 5FDC, 4YVY, 5DSM, 5DSL, 5FDI, 5DSJ, 5DSQ, 5DSR, 5C8I, 5DSK, 5G03, 5DSI, 5G0B, 5G0C, 5G01, 5DSO, 5A6H
Enzyme activity
EC #	BRENDA	ExPASy	KEGG	MetaCyc
4.2.1.1	↗	↗	↗	↗
4.2.1.69	↗	↗	↗	↗

Gene location (Human)
Chr.	Chromosome 8 (human)
Band	8q21.2	Start	85,463,968 bp
Band	8q21.2	End	85,481,493 bp

Gene location (Mouse)
Chr.	Chromosome 3 (mouse)
Band	3 A1|3 3.23 cM	Start	14,951,333 bp
Band	3 A1|3 3.23 cM	End	14,965,830 bp
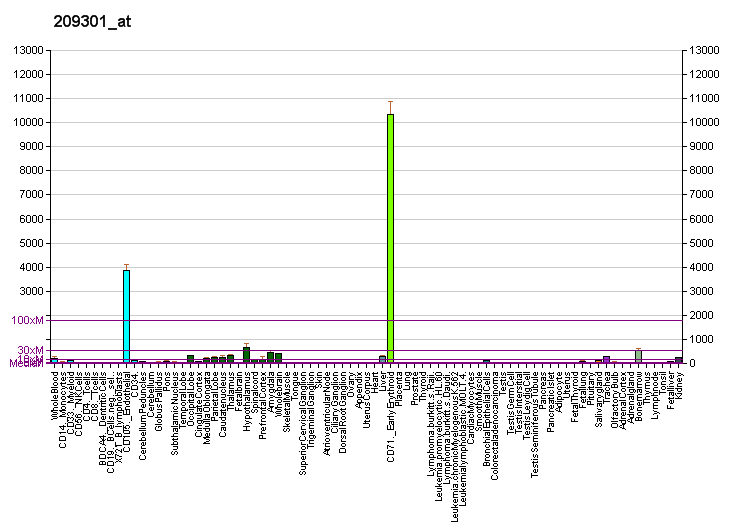
RNA expression pattern
Bgee	Human / Mouse (ortholog); Top expressed in: mucosa of colon; mucosa of sigmoid colon; mucosa of transverse colon; rectum; sperm; mucosa of ileum; trabecular bone; jejunal mucosa; pylorus; tibia / Top expressed in: fetal liver hematopoietic progenitor cell; tibiofemoral joint; gastric mucosa; epithelium of stomach; mucous cell of stomach; human fetus; pyloric antrum; choroid plexus of fourth ventricle; deep cerebellar nuclei; left colon; More reference expression data
BioGPS	More reference expression data
Gene ontology
Molecular function	zinc ion binding; metal ion binding; protein binding; lyase activity; carbonate dehydratase activity; arylesterase activity
Cellular component	cytoplasm; cytosol; membrane; myelin sheath; apical part of cell; plasma membrane; microvillus; axon; basolateral plasma membrane; extracellular exosome; extracellular space
Biological process	one-carbon metabolic process; regulation of chloride transport; kidney development; response to steroid hormone; angiotensin-activated signaling pathway; regulation of intracellular pH; response to zinc ion; positive regulation of osteoclast differentiation; positive regulation of bone resorption; cellular response to fluid shear stress; positive regulation of synaptic transmission, GABAergic; response to organic substance; secretion; response to estrogen; morphogenesis of an epithelium; odontogenesis of dentin-containing tooth; bicarbonate transport; positive regulation of cellular pH reduction; response to pH; regulation of anion transport; positive regulation of dipeptide transmembrane transport; carbon dioxide transport
Sources:Amigo / QuickGO
Orthologs
Databases	NCBI: entry; OMA: entry
Species	Human	Mouse
Entrez	760	12349
Ensembl	ENSG00000104267	ENSMUSG00000027562
UniProt	P00918	P00920
RefSeq (mRNA)	NM_001293675; NM_000067	NM_009801; NM_001357334
RefSeq (protein)	NP_000058; NP_001280604	NP_033931; NP_001344263
Location (UCSC)	Chr 8: 85.46 – 85.48 Mb	Chr 3: 14.95 – 14.97 Mb
PubMed search
- Wikidata
View/Edit Human	View/Edit Mouse

Carbonic anhydrase II (gene name CA2) is one of sixteen forms of human α carbonic anhydrases. Carbonic anhydrase catalyzes reversible hydration of carbon dioxide. Defects in this enzyme are associated with osteopetrosis and renal tubular acidosis. Renal carbonic anhydrase allows the reabsorption of bicarbonate ions in the proximal tubule. Loss of carbonic anhydrase activity in bones impairs the ability of osteoclasts to promote bone resorption, leading to osteopetrosis.

== Interactions ==
Carbonic anhydrase II has been shown to interact with band 3 and sodium-hydrogen antiporter 1.
