= Felix Lewandowsky =

German dermatologist (1879–1921)

Felix Lewandowsky (1 October 1879, Hamburg – 31 October 1921, Basel) was a German dermatologist.

== Biography ==
In 1902, he earned his doctorate at the University of Strassburg. From 1903 to 1907, he worked at the dermatological clinic in Bern, where he served as an assistant to Josef Jadassohn (1863–1936). Afterwards, he returned to his hometown of Hamburg, where he worked in dermatologist Eduard Arning’s department at St. Georg's Hospital. In 1917, he was appointed director of the dermatological clinic at Basel. While at Basel, he was the author of works on leprosy.

Lewandowsky specialized in the study of tuberculosis and pediatric skin diseases, and published an important work in 1916 on tuberculosis of the skin titled Die Tuberkulose der Haut. With Jadassohn, he described an ectodermal dysplasia now known as Jadassohn–Lewandowsky syndrome. Just prior to his death, he described epidermodysplasia verruciformis, a rare skin disorder sometimes known as "Lewandowsky–Lutz dysplasia" (named along with dermatologist Wilhelm Lutz 1888–1958).

He died on 31 October 1921 in Basel.

== Published works ==
- Experimentelle Studien über Hauttuberkulose, 1909 – Experimental studies of skin tuberculosis.
- Die tuberkulose der haut, 1916 – Tuberculosis of the skin.
- Die Fortschritte der Syphilidologie: Oeffentliche Antrittsvorlesung, 1918 – Advances in syphilidology.
- Zur Kenntnis der Boeckschen Sarkoide, 1921 – Towards the understanding of Boeck's Sarcoid.
- Zur Impetigofrage, 1922 – Questions about impetigo.
- Handbuch der Haut- und Geschlechtskrankheiten : Tuberkulose der Haut- u. Geschlechtskrankheiten / Bearb. von Richard Volk. Vollst. neu bearb. unter Zugrundelegg d. gleichnam. Werkes von F. Lewandowsky [u. a.], Volumes 10-11 (1931).

== See also ==
- Jadassohn–Lewandowsky syndrome
