= TCIRG1 =

Mammalian gene encoding V-ATPase enzyme

Identifiers
- Aliases: TCIRG1, ATP6N1C, ATP6V0A3, Atp6i, OC-116kDa, OC116, OPTB1, Stv1, TIRC7, Vph1, a3, T-cell immune regulator 1, ATPase H+ transporting V0 subunit a3, T cell immune regulator 1, ATPase H+ transporting V0 subunit a3
- External IDs: OMIM: 604592; MGI: 1350931; GeneCards: TCIRG1

Gene location (Human)
| Chr. | Chromosome 11 (human) |
| Band | 11q13.2 | Start | 68,039,016 bp |
| Band | 11q13.2 | End | 68,050,895 bp |

Gene location (Mouse)
| Chr. | Chromosome 19 (mouse) |
| Band | 19 A|19 3.62 cM | Start | 3,946,050 bp |
| Band | 19 A|19 3.62 cM | End | 3,957,133 bp |
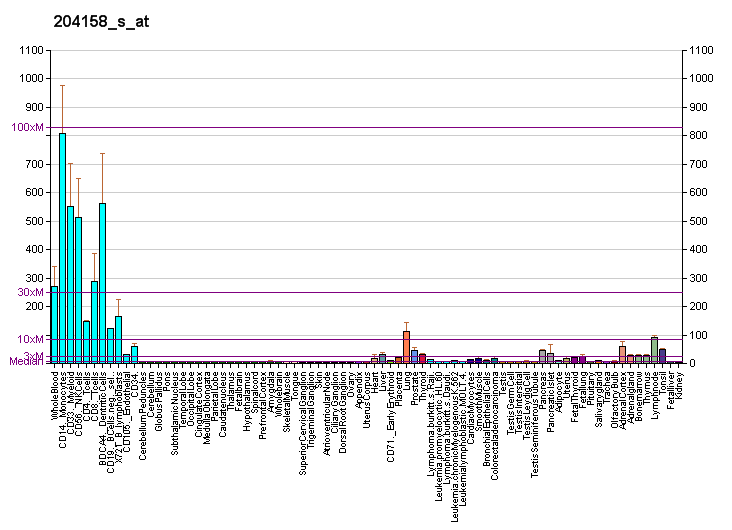
RNA expression pattern
| Bgee | Human / Mouse (ortholog); Top expressed in: granulocyte; blood; spleen; body of pancreas; right adrenal cortex; left adrenal cortex; canal of the cervix; gastric mucosa; upper lobe of left lung; right lung / Top expressed in: stroma of bone marrow; granulocyte; body of femur; thymus; decidua; internal carotid artery; tibiofemoral joint; mesenteric lymph nodes; external carotid artery; duodenum; More reference expression data |
| BioGPS | More reference expression data |
Gene ontology
| Molecular function | transporter activity; ATPase binding; proton-transporting ATPase activity, rotational mechanism; proton transmembrane transporter activity |
| Cellular component | integral component of membrane; proton-transporting V-type ATPase, V0 domain; phagocytic vesicle membrane; membrane; vacuolar proton-transporting V-type ATPase, V0 domain; plasma membrane; integral component of plasma membrane; lysosomal membrane; apical plasma membrane; mitochondrion; vacuolar proton-transporting V-type ATPase complex; endosome membrane; ficolin-1-rich granule membrane; nucleus; lysosome; late endosome; secretory granule membrane; phagocytic vesicle |
| Biological process | protein catabolic process in the vacuole; insulin receptor signaling pathway; transferrin transport; vacuolar proton-transporting V-type ATPase complex assembly; ion transport; vacuolar acidification; cellular defense response; ion transmembrane transport; positive regulation of cell population proliferation; ATP synthesis coupled proton transport; macroautophagy; phagosome acidification; neutrophil degranulation; transport; proton transmembrane transport; ossification; osteoclast proliferation; immunoglobulin production; cellular calcium ion homeostasis; apoptotic process; inflammatory response; regulation of proton transport; response to silver ion; regulation of gene expression; immunoglobulin mediated immune response; optic nerve development; myeloid cell differentiation; B cell differentiation; T cell differentiation; osteoclast differentiation; memory T cell activation; T-helper 1 cell activation; odontogenesis; T cell homeostasis; tooth eruption; bone resorption; regulation of osteoblast differentiation; pH reduction; homeostasis of number of cells; regulation of insulin secretion; retina development in camera-type eye; hematopoietic stem cell homeostasis; enamel mineralization; cellular response to cytokine stimulus; dentin mineralization |
Sources:Amigo / QuickGO
Orthologs
| Databases | NCBI: entry; OMA: entry |
| Species | Human | Mouse |
| Entrez | 10312 | 27060 |
| Ensembl | ENSG00000110719 | ENSMUSG00000001750 |
| UniProt | Q13488 | n/a |
| RefSeq (mRNA) | NM_006019; NM_006053; NM_001351059 | NM_001136091; NM_001167784; NM_016921 |
| RefSeq (protein) | NP_006010; NP_006044; NP_001337988 | n/a |
| Location (UCSC) | Chr 11: 68.04 – 68.05 Mb | Chr 19: 3.95 – 3.96 Mb |
| PubMed search |
- Wikidata
| View/Edit Human | View/Edit Mouse |

The TCIRG1 (T cell immune regulator 1) gene encodes for the V-type proton ATPase (V-ATPase) 116 kDa subunit a isoform 3 enzyme.

== Gene ==
TCIRG1 (T cell immune regulator 1) is a gene that encodes the V-type proton ATPase (V-ATPase) 116 kDa subunit a isoform 3 enzyme.

== Isoforms ==
TCIRG1 has two principal isoforms:

- a long isoform, isoform a, also known as OC116, which corresponds to the full-length V-ATPase a3 subunit;
- a short isoform, isoform b, also known as TIRC7, which is N-terminally truncated and lacks amino acid residues 1–216 of the long isoform.

== Function ==
Through alternative splicing, TCIRG1 encodes two major protein isoforms related to subunits of the vacuolar ATPase (V-ATPase). These isoforms appear to have distinct biological roles. V-ATPase is a multisubunit enzyme that acidifies eukaryotic intracellular organelles, a process required for functions such as protein sorting, zymogen activation, and receptor-mediated endocytosis. The enzyme consists of a cytosolic V_{1} domain and a transmembrane V_{0} domain.

The TIRC7 isoform is expressed in T lymphocytes and is essential for normal T cell activation. This variant uses a transcription start site within exon 5 of variant 1 and incorporates an intron sequence into its 5′ UTR.

== TIRC7 ==
TIRC7 is a 75 kDa membrane protein, first described in 1998, that plays a central role in T cell activation.

=== Expression ===
TIRC7 is induced after immune activation on the cell surface of certain peripheral human T and B cells as well as monocytes and IL-10 expressing regulatory T cells. During immune activation, TIRC7 is co-localized with the T cell receptor and CTLA4 within the immune synapse of human T cells. At the protein and mRNA level, its expression is induced in lymphocytes in synovial tissues obtained from patients with rheumatoid arthritis or during rejection of solid organ transplants and bone marrow transplantation as well as in brain tissues obtained from patients with multiple sclerosis.

=== Function ===
Antibody targeting of TIRC7 suppresses T cell activation and IL-2 secretion. Specifically, significant prevention of inflammation in a variety of animal models has been shown. These include rejection of transplanted kidney and heart allografts as well as progression of arthritis and experimental autoimmune encephalomyelitis (EAE). These effects were accompanied with significant decreases of Th1 specific cytokines e.g. IFN-gamma, TNF-alpha, IL-2 expression and transcription, induction of CTLA4 whereas IL-10 remained unchanged. The induction of TIRC7 in IL-10 secreting T regulatory cells and the prevention of colitis in the presence of TIRC7 positive T regulatory cells supports the inhibitory signals induced via TIRC7 pathway during immune activation. Further evidence for the inhibitory role of TIRC7 during the course of immune response is that prevention of colitis was achievable by a transfer of TIRC7 positive cells into CD45RO mice prior to induction of colitis. The negative immune regulatory role of TIRC7 is furthermore supported by the fact that TIRC7 knock out mice exhibits an increased T and B cell response in the presence of various stimuli in vitro and in vivo exhibiting. A significant induced memory cell subset and reduction of CTLA4 expression observed in TIRC7 knock out mice.

=== Ligand ===
The cell surface ligand to TIRC7 is the non-polymorphic alpha 2 domain (HLA-DRα2) of HLA DR protein. Upon lymphocyte activation TIRC7 is upregulated to engage HLA-DRα2 and induce apoptotic signals in human CD4+ and CD8+ T-cells. The down-regulation of the immune response is achieved via activation of the intrinsic apoptotic pathway by caspase 9, inhibition of lymphocyte proliferation, SHP-1 recruitment, decrease in phosphorylation of STAT4, TCR-ζ chain and ZAP70 as well as inhibition of FasL expression. HLA-DRα2 and TIRC7 co-localize at the APC-T cell interaction site. In vivo, triggering the HLA-DR-TIRC7 pathway in lipopolysaccaride (LPS) activated lymphocytes using soluble HLA-DRα2 leads to inhibition of proinflammatory as well as inflammatory cytokines and induction of apoptosis. These results strongly support the regulatory role of TIRC7 signalling pathway in lymphocytes.

== Clinical significance ==
TCIRG1 mutations affect the a3 subunit of the vacuolar proton pump, which in turn affects the acidification of the bone-osteoclast interface, resulting in infantile malignant osteopetrosis.

== See also ==
- T cell
- Co-stimulation
- MHC class II
- CTLA-4
- apoptosis

== Bibliography ==
Journal articles

- Finbow ME, Harrison MA (June 1997). "The vacuolar H+-ATPase: a universal proton pump of eukaryotes". The Biochemical Journal. 324 (Pt 3): 697–712. doi:10.1042/bj3240697. PMC 1218484. PMID 9210392.
- Forgac M (May 1999). "Structure and properties of the vacuolar (H+)-ATPases". The Journal of Biological Chemistry. 274 (19): 12951–12954. doi:10.1074/jbc.274.19.12951. PMID 10224039.
- Frattini A, Orchard PJ, Sobacchi C, Giliani S, Abinun M, Mattsson JP, et al. (July 2000). "Defects in TCIRG1 subunit of the vacuolar proton pump are responsible for a subset of human autosomal recessive osteopetrosis". Nature Genetics. 25 (3): 343–346. doi:10.1038/77131. PMID 10888887. S2CID 21316081.
- Heinemann T, Bulwin GC, Randall J, Schnieders B, Sandhoff K, Volk HD, et al. (May 1999). "Genomic organization of the gene coding for TIRC7, a novel membrane protein essential for T cell activation". Genomics. 57 (3): 398–406. doi:10.1006/geno.1999.5751. PMID 10329006.
- Kane PM (February 1999). "Introduction: V-ATPases 1992-1998". Journal of Bioenergetics and Biomembranes. 31 (1): 3–5. doi:10.1023/A:1001884227654. PMID 10340843.
- Kawasaki-Nishi S, Nishi T, Forgac M (June 2003). "Proton translocation driven by ATP hydrolysis in V-ATPases". FEBS Letters. 545 (1): 76–85. Bibcode:2003FEBSL.545...76K. doi:10.1016/S0014-5793(03)00396-X. PMID 12788495. S2CID 10507213.
- Kornak U, Schulz A, Friedrich W, Uhlhaas S, Kremens B, Voit T, et al. (August 2000). "Mutations in the a3 subunit of the vacuolar H(+)-ATPase cause infantile malignant osteopetrosis". Human Molecular Genetics. 9 (13): 2059–2063. doi:10.1093/hmg/9.13.2059. PMID 10942435.
- Morel N (October 2003). "Neurotransmitter release: the dark side of the vacuolar-H+ATPase". Biology of the Cell. 95 (7): 453–457. doi:10.1016/S0248-4900(03)00075-3. PMID 14597263. S2CID 17519696.
- Nelson N, Harvey WR (April 1999). "Vacuolar and plasma membrane proton-adenosinetriphosphatases". Physiological Reviews. 79 (2): 361–385. doi:10.1152/physrev.1999.79.2.361. PMID 10221984. S2CID 1477911.
- Nishi T, Forgac M (February 2002). "The vacuolar (H+)-ATPases--nature's most versatile proton pumps". Nature Reviews. Molecular Cell Biology. 3 (2): 94–103. doi:10.1038/nrm729. PMID 11836511. S2CID 21122465.
- Stevens TH, Forgac M (1998). "Structure, function and regulation of the vacuolar (H+)-ATPase". Annual Review of Cell and Developmental Biology. 13: 779–808. doi:10.1146/annurev.cellbio.13.1.779. PMID 9442887.
- Wieczorek H, Brown D, Grinstein S, Ehrenfeld J, Harvey WR (August 1999). "Animal plasma membrane energization by proton-motive V-ATPases". BioEssays. 21 (8): 637–648. doi:10.1002/(SICI)1521-1878(199908)21:8<637::AID-BIES3>3.0.CO;2-W. PMID 10440860. S2CID 23505139.

Websites

- "TCIRG1 gene". MedlinePlus. National Library of Medicine. 18 August 2020.
- "TCIRG1". Wikigenes. 13 October 2011.
- "TCIRG1: T cell immune regulator 1, ATPase H+ transporting V0 subunit a3 [Homo sapiens (human)]". Gene. NCBI. 16 March 2021.
