= CLCN7 =

Protein-coding gene in humans

Identifiers
- Aliases: CLCN7, CLC-7, CLC7, OPTA2, OPTB4, PPP1R63, chloride voltage-gated channel 7, HOD
- External IDs: OMIM: 602727; MGI: 1347048; GeneCards: CLCN7

Gene location (Human)
Chr.	Chromosome 16 (human)
Band	16p13.3	Start	1,444,934 bp
Band	16p13.3	End	1,475,084 bp

Gene location (Mouse)
Chr.	Chromosome 17 (mouse)
Band	17 A3.3|17 12.53 cM	Start	25,352,365 bp
Band	17 A3.3|17 12.53 cM	End	25,381,078 bp
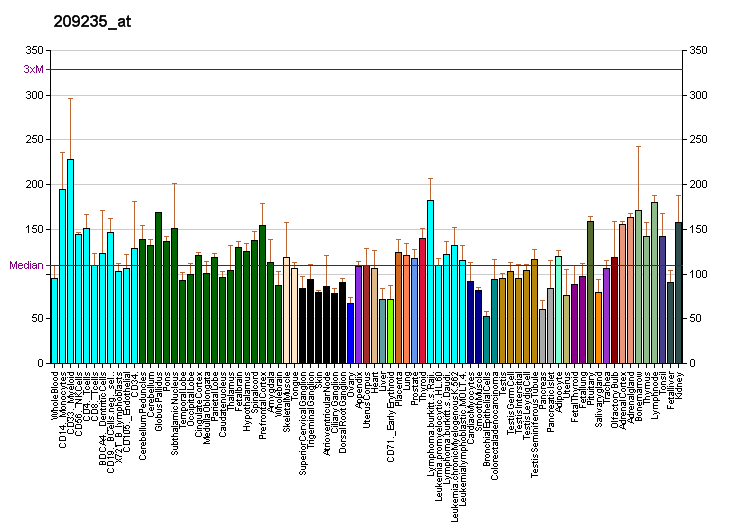

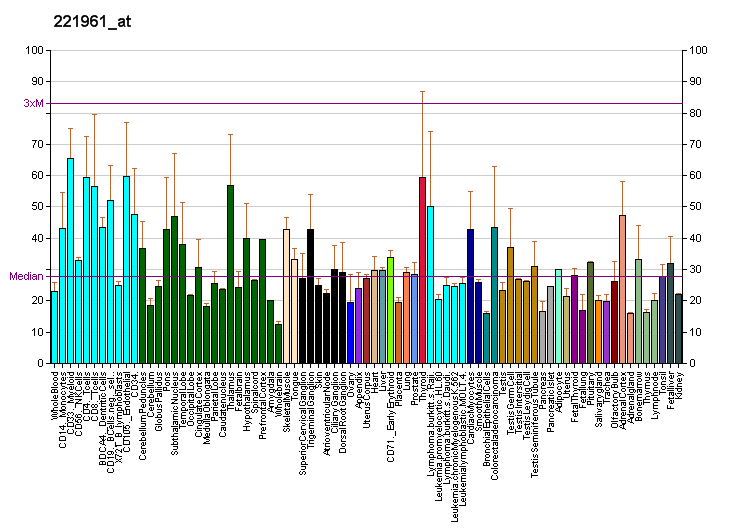

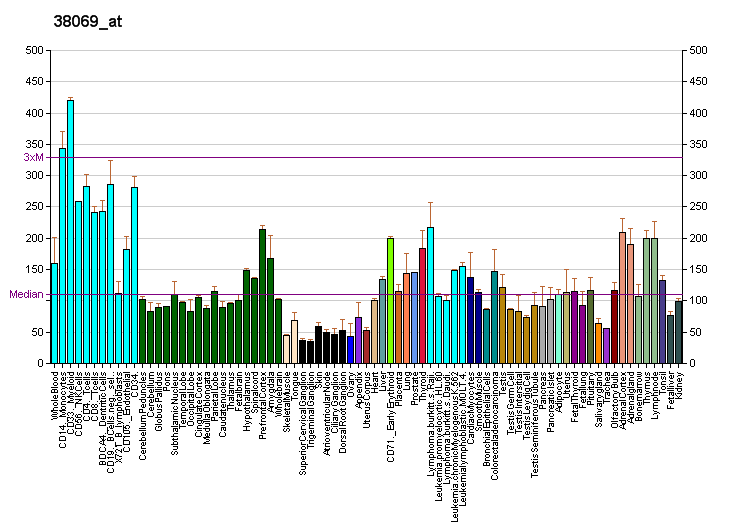
RNA expression pattern
Bgee	Human / Mouse (ortholog); Top expressed in: right adrenal cortex; left adrenal cortex; right hemisphere of cerebellum; stromal cell of endometrium; granulocyte; right lobe of thyroid gland; left lobe of thyroid gland; spleen; anterior pituitary; right frontal lobe / Top expressed in: superior surface of tongue; gallbladder; ganglion of vagus nerve; stroma of bone marrow; neural layer of retina; right kidney; decidua; entorhinal cortex; perirhinal cortex; ankle joint; More reference expression data
BioGPS	More reference expression data
Gene ontology
Molecular function	nucleotide binding; ion channel activity; antiporter activity; ATP binding; chloride channel activity; voltage-gated chloride channel activity; protein binding; chloride transmembrane transporter activity; transmembrane transporter activity
Cellular component	integral component of membrane; lysosome; cytoplasmic vesicle; lysosomal membrane; membrane; nucleoplasm; intracellular membrane-bounded organelle
Biological process	ion transmembrane transport; chloride transport; ion transport; regulation of anion transmembrane transport; response to pH; transmembrane transport; chloride transmembrane transport; transport
Sources:Amigo / QuickGO
Orthologs
Databases	NCBI: entry; OMA: entry
Species	Human	Mouse
Entrez	1186	26373
Ensembl	ENSG00000103249	ENSMUSG00000036636
UniProt	P51798	O70496
RefSeq (mRNA)	NM_001114331; NM_001287	NM_011930; NM_001317404
RefSeq (protein)	NP_001107803; NP_001278	NP_001304333; NP_036060
Location (UCSC)	Chr 16: 1.44 – 1.48 Mb	Chr 17: 25.35 – 25.38 Mb
PubMed search
- Wikidata
View/Edit Human	View/Edit Mouse

Chloride channel 7 alpha subunit also known as H^{+}/Cl^{−} exchange transporter 7 is a protein that in humans is encoded by the CLCN7 gene. In melanocytic cells this gene is regulated by the Microphthalmia-associated transcription factor.

== Clinical significance ==
Mutations in the CLCN7 gene have been reported to be associated with autosomal dominant osteopetrosis type II, a rare disease of bones.

== See also ==
- Chloride channel
