= Jadassohn's Handbook of Skin and Venereal Diseases =

Medical textbook in the field of dermatology

Jadassohn's Handbook of Skin and Venereal Diseases, or Handbuch der Haut- und Geschlechtskrankheiten, is a medical textbook in the field of dermatology initially edited by Joseph Jadassohn between 1927 and 1933. It was later edited by Heinrich Adolf Gottron and G.W. Korting.
