= Heinrich Adolf Gottron =

German dermatologist

Heinrich Adolf Gottron (10 March 1890 – 23 June 1974) was a German dermatologist remembered for Gottron's papules and Gottron's syndrome.

He also edited Joseph Jadassohn's Handbook of Skin and Venereal Diseases.
