= Pachyosteosclerosis =

Condition in which bones are effected by both Osteosclerosis and Pachyostosis

Pachyosteosclerosis is a combination of thickening (pachyostosis) and densification (osteosclerosis) of bones. It makes bones more heavy, but also more fragile. The condition often occurs in aquatic vertebrates, especially those living in shallow waters, creating ballast as an adaptation for maintaining neutral buoyancy and horizontal trim. It is in no way pathological. To resist bend, it frequently is found especially in ventral bones, whereas concentration near the lungs helps in maintaining trim. Examples of animals showing pachyosteosclerosis are seacows (dugongs and manatees), the extinct Plesiosauria and Mesosauria and extinct aquatic sloths.

== See also ==
- Pachyostosis
- Osteosclerosis
