= Enostosis =

Small, hard nodule within the interior of a bone

- Other names: Bone island
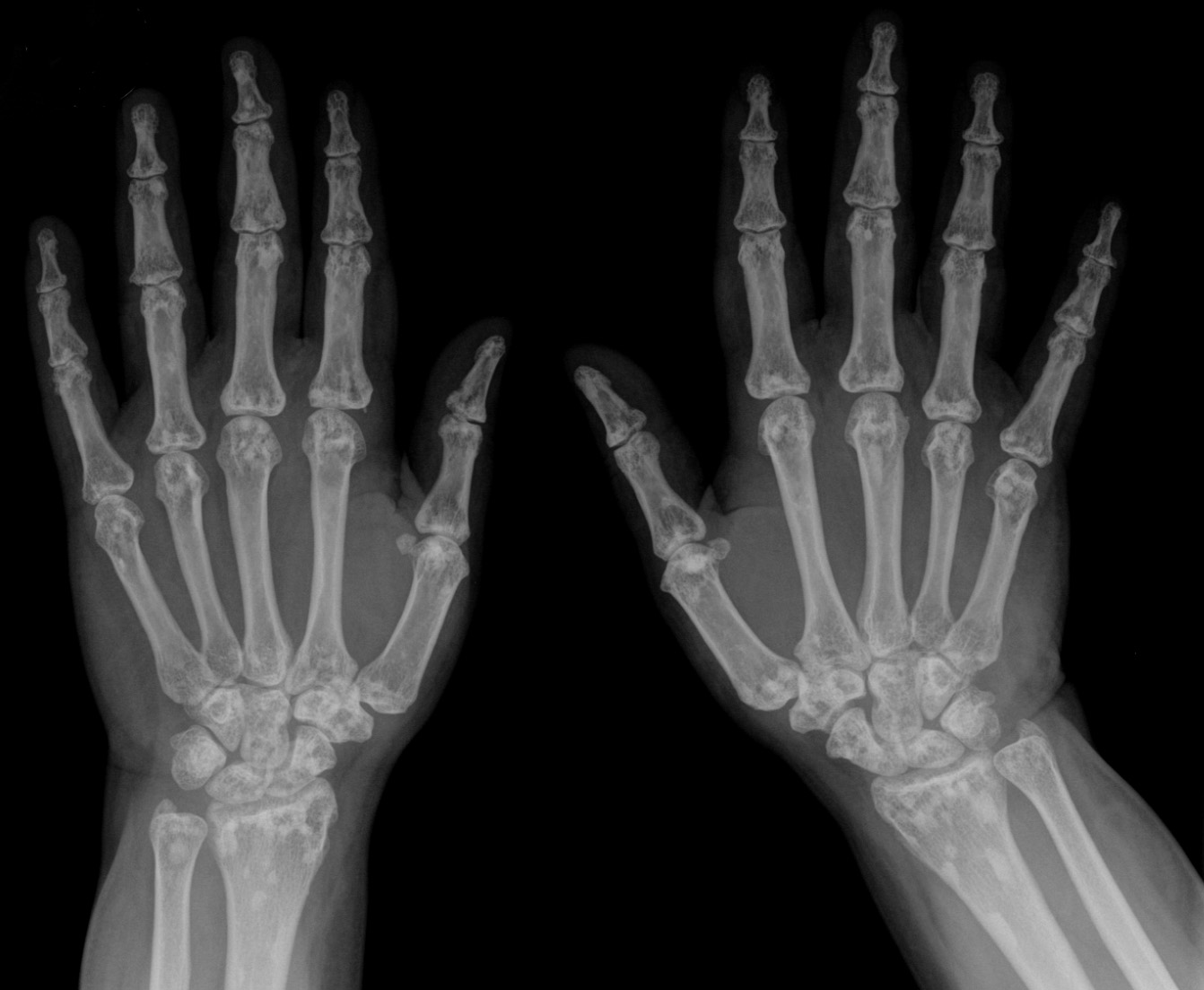
- Osteopoikilosis results in multiple enostoses.
- Specialty: Orthopedic

An enostosis is a small area of compact bone within the cancellous bone. They are commonly seen as an incidental finding on radiographs or CT scans. They are typically very small and do not cause any symptoms. Their radiodensity is generally similar to cortical bone. No treatment is necessary. Multiple enostoses are present in osteopoikilosis.

== Spine ==
Enostosis is usually found in T1 to T7 for the thoracic spine and L2 to L3 in the lumbar spine. It consists of cortical bone merging with medullary bone with irregular margins. The shape of the lesion is round or oval with a thornlike margin, up to 2 cm in diameter. In both T1 and T2-weighted imaging, it shows low signal intensity. It is usually presented as a single lesion.
