= Hystrix-like ichthyosis–deafness syndrome =

- This condition is inherited in an autosomal dominant manner.
- Specialty: Dermatology

Hystrix-like ichthyosis–deafness syndrome (also known as "HID syndrome") is a cutaneous condition characterized by a keratoderma.

== See also ==
- KID syndrome
- List of cutaneous conditions
