= Axial osteomalacia =

- Axial osteomalacia is inherited in an autosomal dominant manner
- Specialty: Orthopedic

Axial osteomalacia is a rare osteosclerotic disorder characterized by axial skeleton pain, coarsening of the trabecular bone pattern on radiographs of the axial but not appendicular skeleton.
