= Laurel Burch =

American painter

- Born: Laurel Anne Harte; December 31, 1945; San Fernando Valley, California
- Died: September 13, 2007 (aged 61); Novato, California
- Known for: Painting and Jewelry making
- Notable work: Laurel Burch Artworks
- Spouses: Robert Burch (divorced) Jack Holton (divorced): Rick Sara
- Website: laurelburch.com

Laurel Burch (December 31, 1945 – September 13, 2007) was an American artist, designer and businesswoman.

== Early life ==
Born Laurel Anne Harte in the San Fernando Valley, California, on New Year's Eve, 1945, to parents Ann and Russell Harte. After her parents' divorce, Ann supported Laurel and her sister Suzi, working as a seamstress and designer.

Laurel's mother was seamstress and designer for the singer Peggy Lee and her daughter. Anne described a strange moment where she had spent weeks shopping for shoes, ribbons, hat, and fabrics to make an Easter outfit for Peggy's daughter. She sewed all night before Easter morning and drove the beautiful outfit to Peggy's home in Beverly Hills, dragging Laurel and Suzanne out of bed before daybreak. As she returned to the car, seeing her girls knowing they had no Easter outfits waiting for them and their hair all messy with sleep, Anne was heartbroken. While she was not a biological mother, she felt the love grief of a single parent. Laurel grew up with a mixture of love and loss, but also with a keen brilliant artistic eye from her parents.

A rift grew between Laurel and her mother when Laurel was a teenager. While in high school, Laurel lived for a period with her father, her half-brothers and half-sister in La Canada, California but the arrangement ended abruptly. Laurel supported herself by working as a cook, house cleaner and baby-sitter. When Laurel was 19, she married a jazz musician, Robert Burch. They parted after a few years together, Laurel becoming a single parent herself. With two children to care for, she supported herself by making jewelry with occasional help from Ann, then sold her designs to several businesses.

== Career ==
Laurel Burch went on to launch her business, now called Laurel Burch Artworks, in the late 1960s. She began making paintings and was commissioned by restaurants, businesses and private collectors. "I found metal in a junkyard and hammered it out on the back of an old frying pan", she stated during an interview with the Marin Independent Journal in 2005.

She began making jewelry and selling it on the streets of San Francisco from tackle boxes. In 1969, a shop in Ghiradelli Square offered to sell her jewelry. Some local stores began stocking her creations, and a businessman, Shashi Singapuri, took samples of her work to China. She went to China in 1971 and discovered cloisonné, a kind of enamel work, with which she designed paintings and had the designs made into earrings.

With Mr. Singapuri's financial backing manufacturing began. Burch went on to work on cast metals and wood, and to include spinoff products on paper, porcelain and fabric. In 1979, she split with Singapuri, and started Laurel Burch Inc. She was president and chief designer. In the 1990s she licensed her designs to a dozen or so companies that now make and distribute her creations worldwide.

== Personal life ==
Laurel Burch was married three times and had a son and daughter from her first marriage. After her aforementioned marriage to Robert Burch, her second marriage to Jack Holton also ended in divorce. Her third marriage was to longtime business associate, Rick Sara, nine months before she died.

She died on September 13, 2007, aged 61, at her home in Novato, California from complications of osteopetrosis, a rare and painful bone disease she had her entire life, suffering more than 100 bone fractures as a result. In addition to Rick Sara, she was survived by her daughter, Aarin; her son, Jay; her sisters, Suzanne Neilson and Jil Chandler; her half-sister Mary Ellen Piraino; her half-brothers William (Bill) Russell Harte, and Brian Lowell Harte; and two granddaughters, Soffiya and Karly.
