= Dermatitis gangrenosa =

- Other names: Gangrene of the skin
- Specialty: Dermatology

Dermatitis gangrenosa is a cutaneous condition caused by a Clostridium infection, resulting in necrosis and sloughing of the skin.

== See also ==
- Skin lesion
