= Keratitis–ichthyosis–deafness syndrome =

Keratitis-ichthyosis-deafness syndrome
- Other names: Erythrokeratodermia progressiva Burns, ichthyosiform erythroderma, corneal involvement, and deafness, KID syndrome.
- This condition is inherited in an autosomal dominant manner.
- Specialty: Medical genetics

Keratitis–ichthyosis–deafness syndrome (KID syndrome), also known as ichthyosiform erythroderma, corneal involvement, and deafness, presents at birth/infancy and is characterized by progressive corneal opacification, either mild generalized hyperkeratosis or discrete erythematous plaques, and neurosensory deafness. It is caused by a mutation in connexin 26.

== See also ==
- Senter syndrome
- Ichthyosis hystrix
- List of cutaneous conditions
