= Paula Ollendorff =

German women's activist (1860–1938)

Paula Ollendorff (1860 - 1938), was a German women's activist and chair of the League of Jewish Women. She moved to Palestine in 1937 and died in Jerusalem in 1938.
