= Josef Jadassohn =

German dermatologist

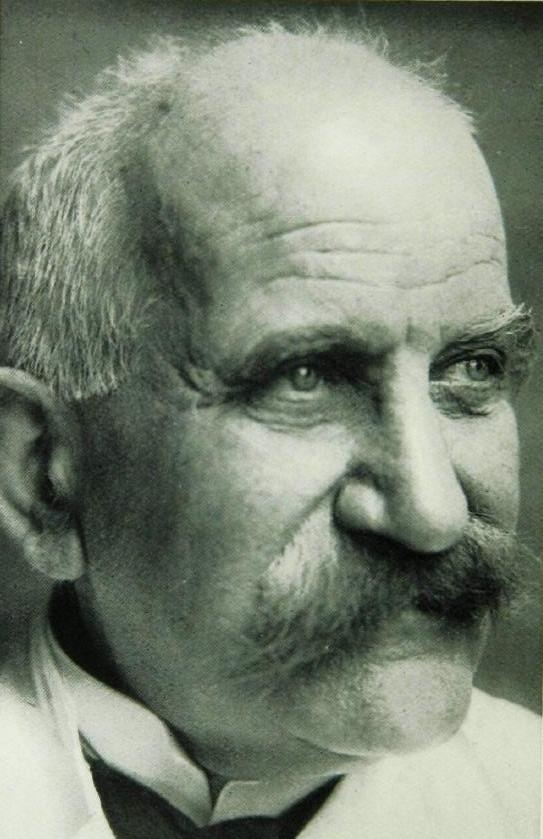
Josef Jadassohn

Joseph (Josef) Jadassohn (10 September 1863 in Liegnitz – 24 March 1936 in Zurich) was a German dermatologist.

== Biography ==
He was an assistant to Albert Neisser at the Allerheiligen Hospital in Breslau until 1892, the director of the university skin clinic in Bern (1896–1917), and later a professor of dermatology at Breslau University (1917–1932).

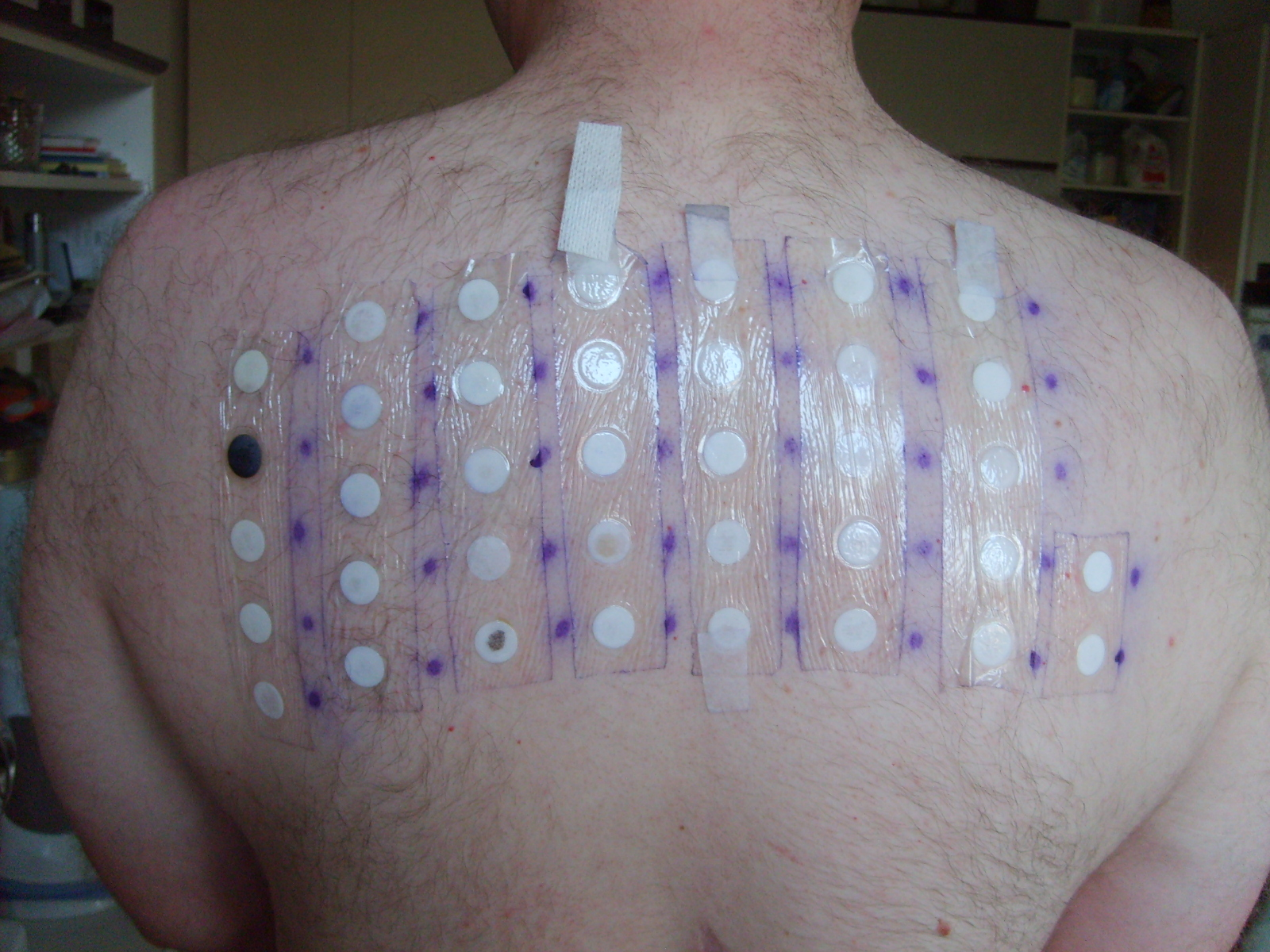
Patch test

Jadassohn was among the first to take an immunological approach in research of dermatological disorders, and contributed to the understanding of the immunopathology of tuberculosis and trichophytosis. He was a pioneer in the field of allergology, and is credited for introducing patch testing for diagnosis of contact dermatitis. In 1901 he described a rare childhood dermatological disorder known as granulosis rubra nasi.

== Conditions ==
Two dermatological disorders that are named after him are: "Jadassohn's disease I" (a skin disorder originating at the elbow) and "Jadassohn's disease II" (a natal skin disorder affecting the face and scalp). Together with his assistants, Walter Dössekker (1868–1962), Max Tièche (1878–1938), and Felix Lewandowsky (1879–1921), he shares the following eponymous medical conditions:

- Jadassohn–Dössekker disease: Also known as atypical tuberous myxedema.
- Tièche–Jadassohn naevus: A hard, dark blue, benign melanocytic tumor.
- Jadassohn–Lewandowsky syndrome: An ectodermal dysplasia characterized by onychogryposis, hyperkeratosis, leukoplakia, hyperhidrosis and pachyonychia congenita.
- Nevus Sebaceous of Jadassohn: yellow-orange flat plaque, occurring most commonly on the scalp (60%) or face (30%), usually present at birth, malignant potential (estimated 1%, most commonly basal cell carcinoma), surgically excised prior to hormone-triggered growth during puberty

== Literary works ==
Jadassohn published a revision of Edmund Lesser’s Lehrbuch der Haut- und Geschlechtskrankheiten (14th edition, 1927–30), and from 1927 published the multi-volume Handbuch für Haut- und Geschlechtskrankheiten. Other noted written works of his include:

- Die venerischen Krankheiten, (1901).
- Ueber eine eigenartige Erkrankung der Nasenhaut bei Kindern (Granulosis rubra nasi). Archiv für Dermatologie und Syphilis, Wien, 1901, 58: 145–158.
- Die Tuberkulose der Haut. In: Franz Mracek's Handbuch der Hautkrankheiten (1904).
- Allgemeine Ätiologie, Pathologie, Diagnose und Therapie der Gonorrhoe, (1910).
- Lepra, in Wilhelm Kolle and August Paul von Wassermann's Handbuch der pathogenen Microorganismen. second edition, Jena- 1913; third edition, volume 5,2- 1928.
- Dermatologie, (1938).

== See also ==
- Jadassohn–Lewandowsky syndrome

== References and external links ==
- "Josef Jadassohn". Who Named It. Archived from the original on August 19, 2002.
