= Granulosis rubra nasi =

- Specialty: Dermatology

Granulosis rubra nasi is a rare familial disease of children, occurring on the nose, cheeks, and chin, characterized by diffuse redness, persistent excessive sweating, and small dark red papules that disappear on diascopic pressure.

== Signs and symptoms ==
Granulosis rubra nasi appears as vesicles over the center of the face, papules, pustules, erythema, and hyperhidrosis.

Sweating excessively may occur years before other changes. It appears above the nose tip and occasionally on the cheeks. On the nose, cheeks, and chin, diffuse erythema appears when hyperhidrosis persists. Sweat droplets may be embedded in this erythema, giving it a damp, glistening appearance. Following this, sweat duct orifices may develop erythematous macules, papules, or vesicles. When pressure is released, these lesions resurface after disappearing during diascopy. Although the illness is mainly asymptomatic, one may experience tingling or itching.

== Causes ==
It is thought that granulosis rubra nasi is a hereditary disorder. There are documented familial examples, and autosomal dominant inheritance is thought to occur. The pathophysiology and etiology of this illness, however, remain unclear.

== Diagnosis ==
The diagnosis is typically made clinically. Histologically, perivascular lymphocytic infiltration, dilated sweat ducts, and dilated cutaneous blood vessels are seen.

== Treatment ==
The literature describes the use of topical indomethacin, oral corticosteroids, tetracycline, cryotherapy, and even X-rays for the treatment of granulosis rubra nasi.

== See also ==
- Skin lesion
- List of cutaneous conditions
