= Calcium deficiency =

Calcium deficiency may refer to:

- Calcium deficiency (plant disorder)
- Hypocalcemia, a medical condition in humans where the calcium blood serum levels are abnormally low
