= Madge Macklin =

American physician (1893–1962)

Madge Thurlow Macklin
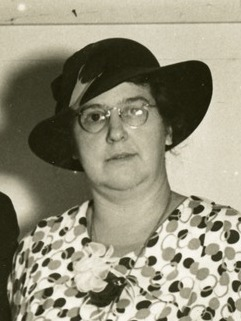
- Born: February 6, 1893; Philadelphia, Pennsylvania
- Died: March 4, 1962 (aged 69)
- Occupation: Physician

Madge Thurlow Macklin (February 6, 1893 – March 4, 1962) was an American physician known for her work in the field of medical genetics, efforts to make genetics a part of medical curriculum, and participation in the eugenics movement.

== Early life and education ==
The fourth of five children born to Margaret De Grofft and William Harrison Thurlow, Madge Thurlow was born in 1893 Philadelphia, Pennsylvania. William Thurlow was an engineer and his influence on Madge's academics showed throughout her persistent interest in sciences and maths. While Macklin was still in grade school, her family relocated to Baltimore, Maryland, where she attended public schools and began studying calculus by age 12. Before her senior year had ended, her family had decided to relocate back to her home town in Pennsylvania. Macklin, however wanted to graduate from the high school in which she was already enrolled. To do so, she moved in with one of her teachers; Nelly Logan.

After graduating from Western High School, she attended Goucher College for her bachelor's degree (1914), Johns Hopkins University for her medical degree (1919) and then returned to Goucher College for her LL.D. (1938). While she was attending Goucher College, she had fellowships at Johns Hopkins University (1915-1915) and at American University (1916-1919). While in school, Macklin was a part of a number of sororities that were academic based. She was a part of Sigma Xi (ΣΞ); which is a scientific research society, Sigma Delta Epsilon (ΣΔΕ); a scientific women's sorority, and Alpha Gamma Delta (ΑΓΔ); a fraternity that encourages academic achievement.

== Family ==
Madge's husband, Charles Clifford Macklin, did not have the same upbringing as she did, he was raised on a farm outside of Toronto, Ontario, and had to forfeit his education at the age 14 because his help was needed on his parents’ farm. However, in 1908 he began studying at the University of Toronto Medical School, which he graduated from in 1914. Also in 1914, he wrote a description of the skull of a human fetus which Franklin P Mall was very impressed by. Based on this description, Mall invited Charles to Johns Hopkins University to work with him, which is where he met Madge.

When they met, Charles was a new instructor in the anatomy department and Madge was in her freshman year. Their relationship blossomed throughout Madge's time at the university. In her final year at Johns Hopkins University, Madge Thurlow married Charles Clifford Macklin on September 17, 1918. Together, the couple had three daughters. The first of which was Carol Adair Macklin, born in October 1919, the second; Sylva Thurlow Macklin, born in February 1921, and the last was Margaret DeGrofft Macklin; named after Madge's mother, born in October 1927.

== Career and research ==
=== Early career ===
After graduating from Johns Hopkins University, Madge taught one semester at University of Pittsburgh Medical School as an instructor of gross anatomy. Then, she was briefly an assistant in physiology at Johns Hopkins University from 1919 to 1921. Later in 1921, Madge, Charles, and their two daughters moved to Canada, and Madge became a part-time instructor of histology and embryology at the University of Western Ontario. She remained in this position until 1930 when she became a part-time assistant professor. Both Madge and Charles worked at the University of Western Ontario, Charles as a professor and Madge only in her part-time positions. She was placed in these part-time positions despite her being regarded as a pioneer of the genetics movement. While she was working there, she also researched medical genetics despite being underpaid and not being promoted to full-time professor.

=== Medical genetics ===
During her time at the University of Western Ontario, while she was studying medical genetics, Madge Macklin advocated for introducing medical genetics into medical curriculum. She wanted genetics to be taught in terms of medical diseases not just in terms of genetic expression and insisted that it be taught by a medically trained individual rather than a geneticist. Due to her advocacy for medical genetics, she was titled the "founding mother" of it. In 1930, while she was still at the University of Western Ontario, Macklin was involved in founding the Canadian Eugenics Society whose committee she served on from 1932 to 1935 and was director of in 1935. Macklin was also a part of the American Society of Human Genetics, serving as its president in 1958.

She was fired from the University of Western Ontario in 1945 and shortly after leaving she received National Research Council funding to work at Ohio State University. Her husband and children stayed behind in Ontario to pursue her research at Ohio State University. However, once she was in an environment that gave her adequate support and respect, Macklin began to conduct cancer research in terms of medical genetics which ended up being the main focus of her career. Over the course of her career, she published over two hundred scientific papers on the topic of medical genetics.

=== Eugenics ===
Although Macklin was a pioneer in the field of medical genetics, she was also involved in eugenics which is a belief that the human population can be improved by deterring people with undesirable traits from reproducing and encouraging those the favorable traits to reproduce. By the early 1930s, Macklin had begun to focus her medical attention on hereditary diseases. Since few of these had therapies, often the only viable medical intervention was prevention; i.e., stopping "defective" people from reproducing. Medical genetics, in her mind, was thus tantamount to negative eugenics. She advocated eugenic approaches to many diseases, from cancer to schizophrenia. Over her career, she published over 20 articles on the topic of eugenics, focused on the sterilization of individuals unfit to be parents of the next generation and individuals who had unfavorable attributes. One of her last major research efforts was a large study of the heritability of breast cancer.

== Honors, awards, and memberships ==
- McLane Lecturer, Goucher College (1937)
- Gibson Memorial Lecturer (1942)
- Elizabeth Blackwell Award (1957)
- Richards Memorial Lecturer, Ontario Cancer Treatment and Research Foundation (1958)
- President, American Society of Human Genetics (1959)
- American Association for the Advancement of Science
- Association of Anatomists
- Canadian Genetics Society
- Human Genetics Society
- Physiologists' Society
- Society of Naturalists
