= Osteopoikilosis =

Formation of hard nodules within the interior of bones

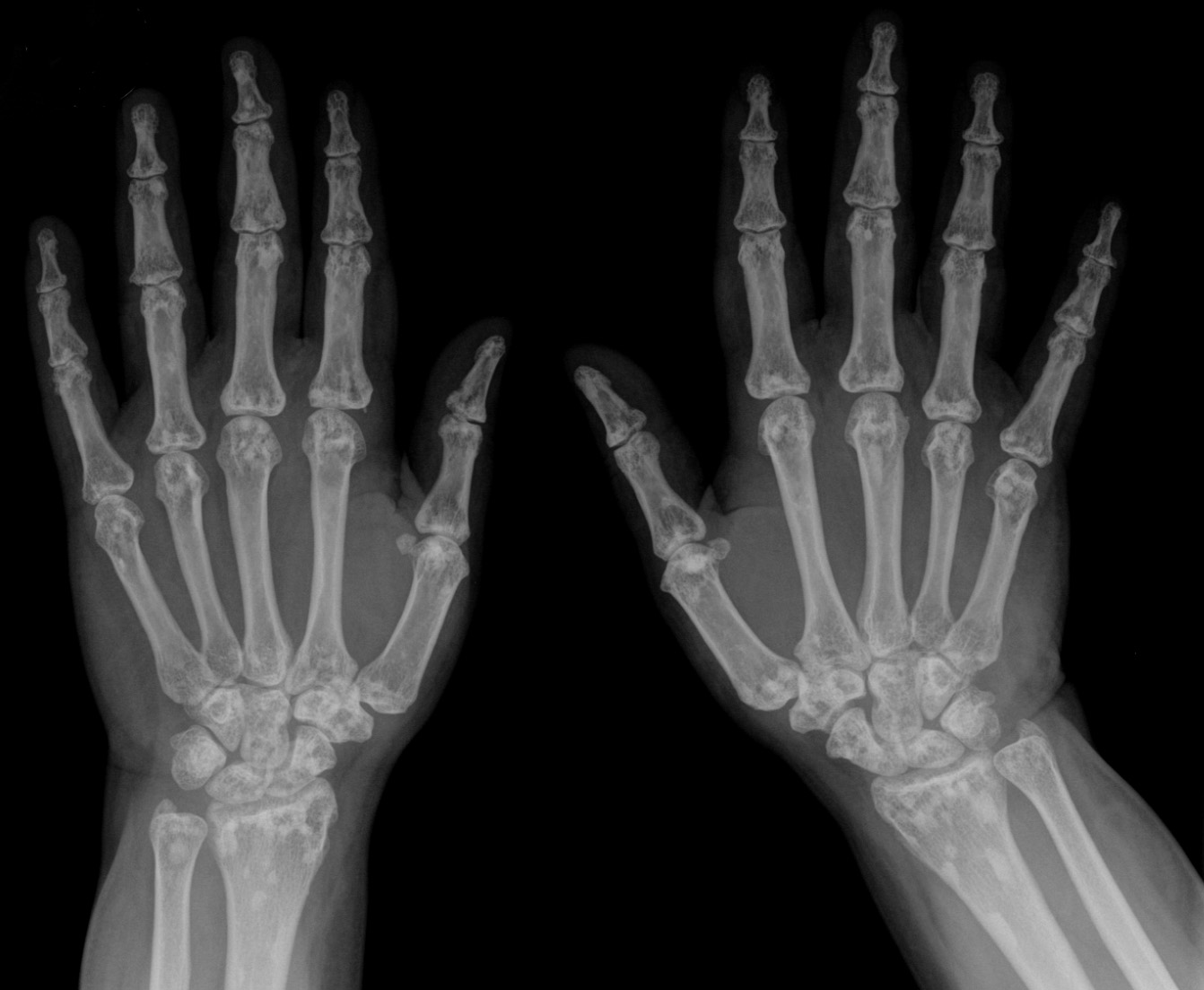
- Osteopoikilosis on an X-ray of the hands
- Specialty: Medical genetics
- Frequency: 0.005%

Osteopoikilosis is a benign, autosomal dominant, sclerosing (hardening) dysplasia of bone characterized by the presence of numerous bone islands in the skeleton.

== Presentation ==
The radiographic appearance of osteopoikilosis on an X-ray is characterized by a pattern of numerous white densities of similar size spread throughout all the bones. This is a systemic condition. It must be differentiated from blastic metastasis, which can also present radiographically as white densities interspersed throughout bone. Blastic metastasis tends to present with larger and more irregular densities in less of a uniform pattern. Another differentiating factor is age, with blastic metastasis mostly affecting older people, and osteopoikilosis being found in people 20 years of age and younger.

The distribution is variable, though it does not tend to affect the ribs, spine, or skull.

== Cause ==
Osteopoikilosis is caused by mutations to the LEMD3 gene. It has autosomal dominant inheritance.

== Epidemiology ==
Men and women are affected in equal number, reflecting the fact that osteopoikilosis attacks indiscriminately. Additionally, the disease is often associated with melorheostosis, despite the apparent lack of correlation between melorheostosis and genetic heritability. It has been tied to LEMD3. Buschke–Ollendorff syndrome is a similar condition, which is also associated with LEMD3.

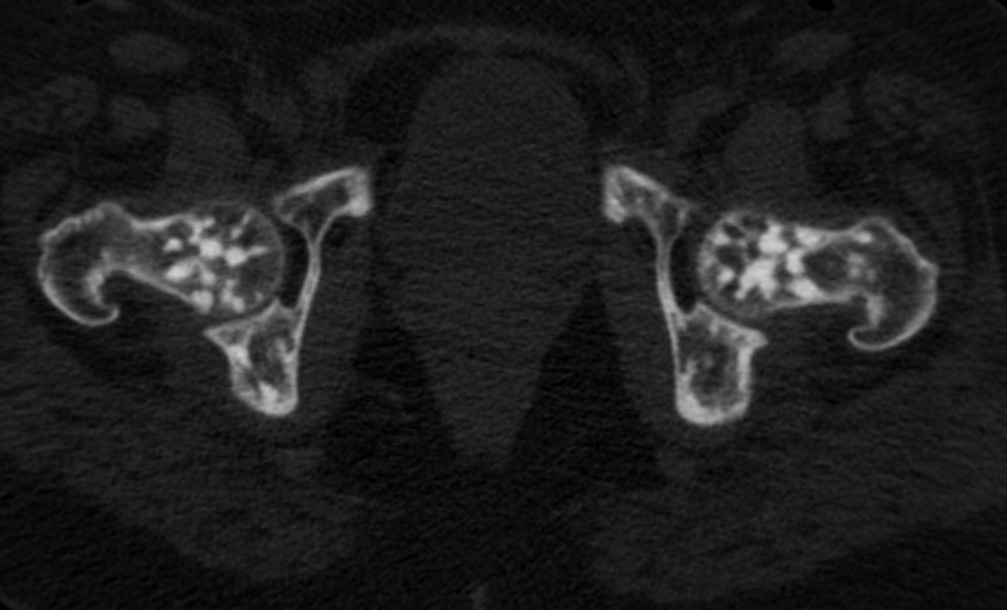
Osteopoikilosis of the hips on CT.

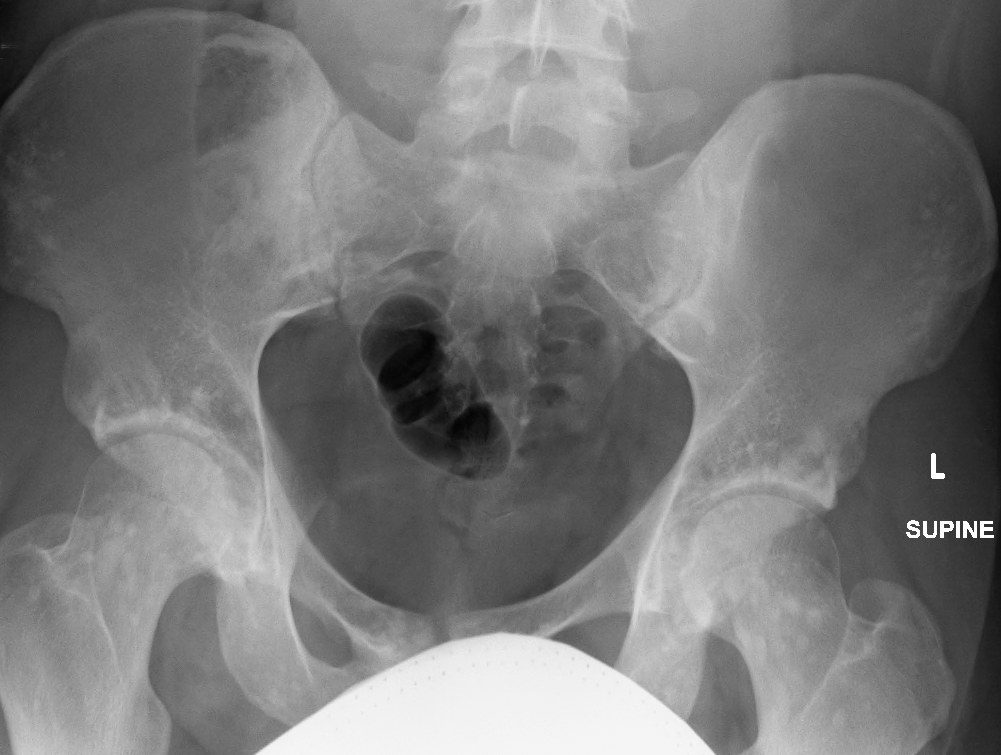
Osteopoikilosis

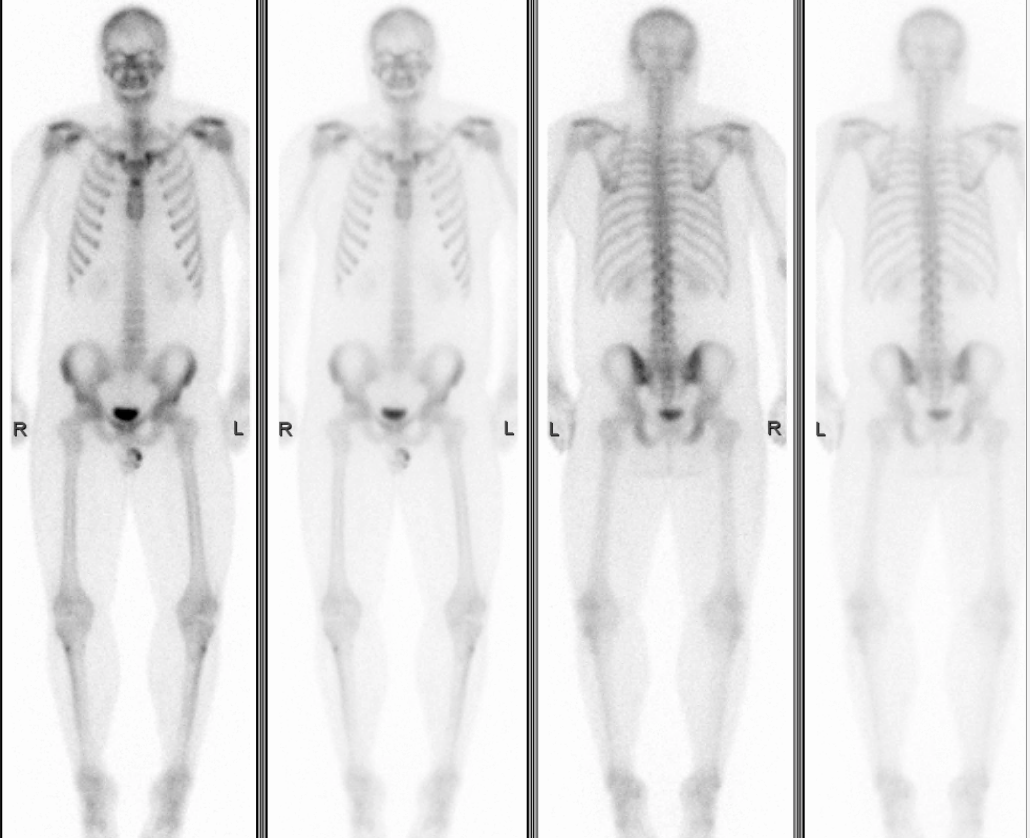
Normal bone scan in a person with osteopoikilosis

== See also ==
- List of radiographic findings associated with cutaneous conditions
