= Edmund Lesser =

German dermatologist

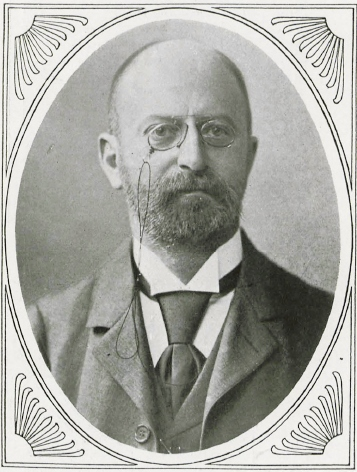
Edmund Lesser

Edmund Lesser (12 May 1852 – 7 June 1918) was a German dermatologist who was a native of Neisse.

He studied medicine at the universities of Berlin, Bonn and Strasbourg, earning his medical doctorate in 1876. Later he became an assistant to Oskar Simon (1845–1892) at the dermatological clinic in Breslau, and in 1882 received his habilitation at the University of Leipzig. In 1892 he was an associate professor at the University of Bonn, and several years later was appointed chief physician of the syphilitic department at the Berlin-Charité (1896). The following year he became head of the dermatological and syphilitic dispensary at the University of Berlin.

== Written works ==
Lesser was a leading authority in the field of syphilis research. He was the author of Lehrbuch der Haut- und Geschlechtskrankheiten für Studirende und Ärzte (Textbook of skin and venereal diseases for students and physicians), a publication that ran for numerous editions. With zoologist Richard Hertwig (1850–1937), he was co-author of Über Rhizopoden und denselben nahestehende Organismen. Other publications by Lesser include:

- Ueber Syphilis maligna (About malignant syphilis)
- Beiträge zur Lehre vom Herpes zoster (Contributions to the doctrine of herpes zoster)
- Ueber Nebenwirkungen bei Injectionen unlöslicher Quecksilberverbindungen (Side effects with injections of insoluble mercury compounds)
- Ueber Syphilis insontium (About syphilis insontium)
- Ueber Ischias gonorrhoica (About sciatica gonorrhoica)
- Die Aussatzhäuser des Mittelalters (Leprosy houses of the Middle Ages).
