= Buschke–Ollendorff syndrome =

Genetic disorder involving small, painless lumps on the skin

Buschke–Ollendorff sign
- Other names: Dermatofibrosis lenticularis disseminata
- Buschke–Ollendorff syndrome has an autosomal dominant pattern of inheritance.
- Symptoms: Papules in skin
- Causes: Mutations in the LEMD3 gene.
- Diagnostic method: X-ray, ultrasound
- Treatment: Surgery for hearing loss(or complications)

Buschke–Ollendorff syndrome (BOS) is a rare genetic skin disorder associated with LEMD3 that typically presents with widespread painless papules.

It is inherited in an autosomal dominant manner. Conditions that may appear similar include tuberous sclerosis, pseudoxanthoma elasticum, neurofibroma, and lipoma, among others.

Its frequency is almost 1 case per every 20,000 people, and it is equally found in both males and females. It is named for Abraham Buschke and Helene Ollendorff Curth, who described the condition in one female in 1928.

== Signs and symptoms ==
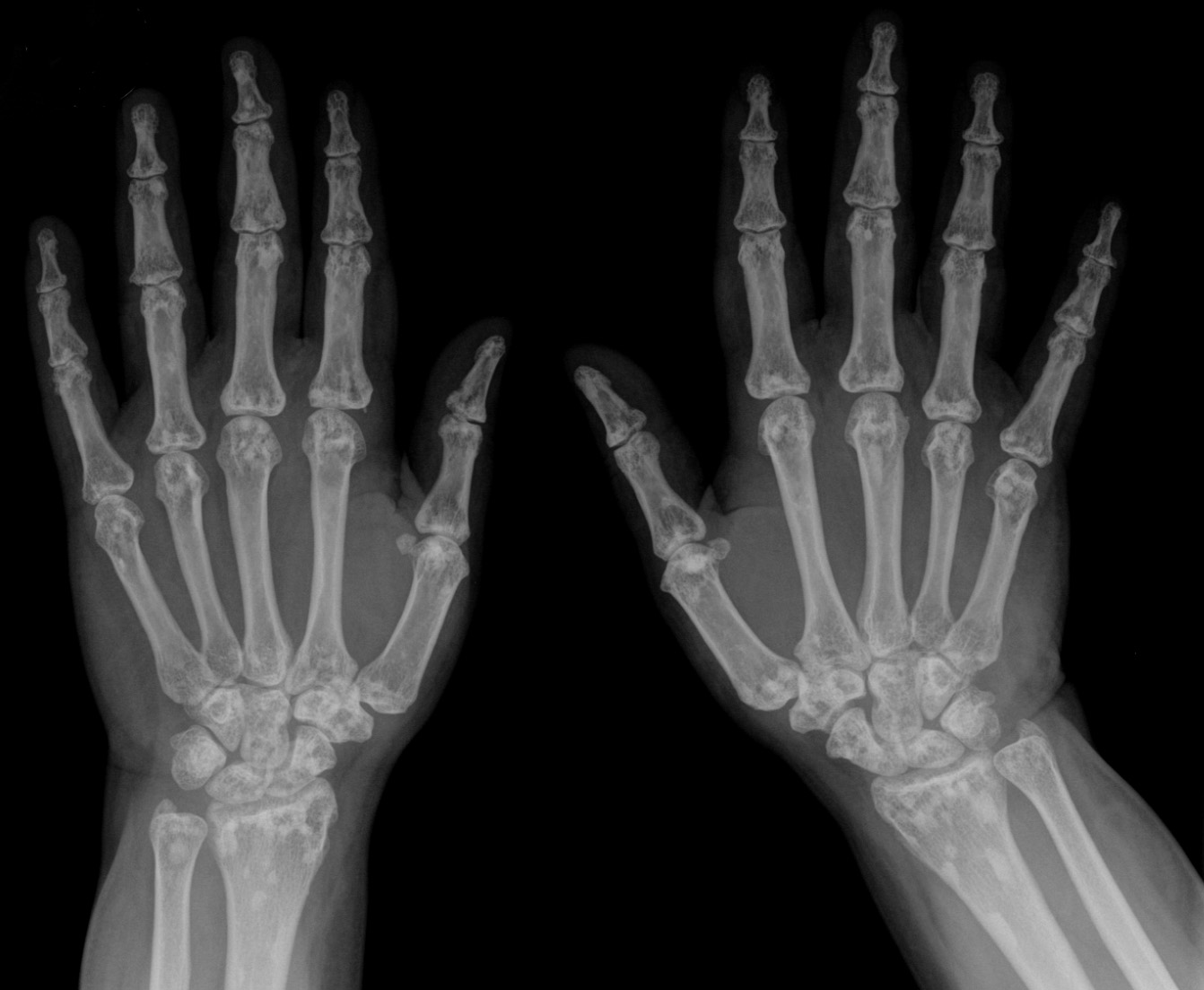
Osteopoikilosis

The signs and symptoms of this condition are consistent with the following (possible complications include aortic stenosis and hearing loss):

- Osteopoikilosis
- Bone pain
- Connective tissue nevi
- Metaphysis abnormality

== Pathogenesis ==
Buschke–Ollendorff syndrome is caused by one important factor: mutations in the LEMD3 gene.

Among the important aspects of Buschke–Ollendorff syndrome condition, genetically speaking are:

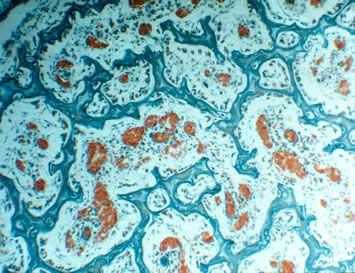
Bone cells

- LEMD3 (protein) referred also as MAN1, is an important protein in inner nuclear membrane.
- LEMD3 gene gives instructions for producing protein that controls signaling for transforming growth factor-beta.
- LEMD3 gene helps in the bone morphogenic protein pathway
- Both of the above pathways help grow new bone cells
- BMP and TGF-β pathways controls SMADs proteins, which then bind to DNA
- LEMD3 once mutated, causes a reduction of the protein, which in turn causes excess of the above two pathways.

== Diagnosis ==
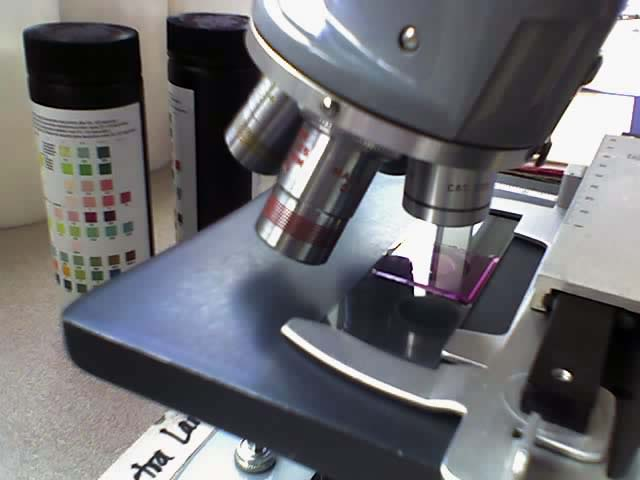
Microscope with stained slide (histological specimen)

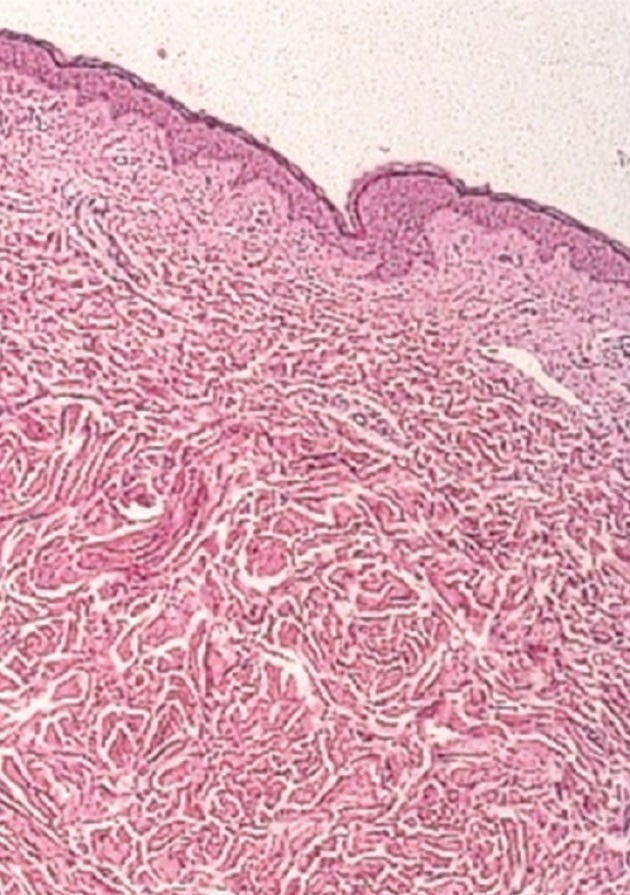
Histopathology of BOS

The diagnosis of this condition can be ascertained via several techniques one such method is genetic testing, as well as:

- X-ray
- Ultrasound
- Histological test

=== Differential diagnosis ===
The differential diagnosis for an individual believed to have Buschke–Ollendorff syndrome is the following:

- Melorheostosis
- Sclerotic bone metastases.

== Treatment ==
In terms of the treatment of Buschke–Ollendorff syndrome, should the complication of aortic stenosis occur then surgery may be required.

Treatment for hearing loss may also require surgical intervention.

== See also ==
- List of cutaneous conditions
