= Albert Ludwig Sigesmund Neisser =

German physician (1855–1916)

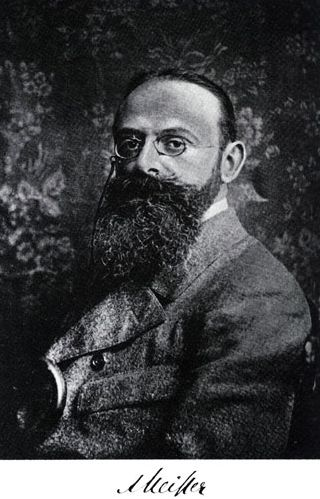
- Born: 22 January 1855; Schweidnitz, Kingdom of Prussia
- Died: 30 July 1916 (aged 61); Breslau, German Empire
- Known for: Discovery of Neisseria
- Scientific career
- Fields: Medicine, microbiology
- Workplaces: University of Breslau

Albert Ludwig Sigesmund Neisser (22 January 1855, Schweidnitz – 30 July 1916, Breslau) was a German physician who discovered the causative agent (pathogen) of gonorrhea, a strain of bacteria that was named in his honour (Neisseria gonorrhoeae).

== Life and career ==
Neisser was born in the Silesian town of Schweidnitz (now Świdnica, in Poland), the son of a well-known Jewish physician, Moritz Neisser. After he completed the elementary school in Münsterberg, Neisser enrolled in the St. Maria Magdalena School in Breslau (now Wrocław, in Poland). In this school, he was a contemporary of another great name in the history of medicine, Paul Ehrlich. He obtained the Abitur in 1872.

Neisser began to study medicine at the University of Breslau, but later moved to Erlangen, completing his studies in 1877. Initially Neisser wanted to be an internist, but did not find a suitable place. He found work, however as an assistant of the dermatologist Oskar Simon (1845–1892), concentrating on sexually transmitted diseases and leprosy. During the following two years he studied and obtained experimental evidence about the pathogen for gonorrhea, Neisseria gonorrhoeae.

Neisser was also the co-discoverer of the causative agent of leprosy. In 1879 the Norwegian physician Gerhard Armauer Hansen gave to young Neisser (who had visited him in Norway to examine some 100 leprosy patients) some tissue samples of his patients. Neisser successfully stained the bacteria and announced his findings in 1880, claiming to have discovered the pathogenesis of leprosy. There was some conflict between Neisser and Hansen, because Hansen had failed to culture the organism and demonstrate unequivocally its link to leprosy, although he had observed the bacterium since 1872.

In 1882 Neisser was appointed professor extraordinarius by the University at the age of 29, and worked as a dermatologist in the university hospital of Breslau. Later he was promoted to the head of the hospital. In the following year he married Toni Neisser, née Kauffmann.

In 1898 Albert Neisser published clinical trials on serum therapy in patients with syphilis. He injected cell-free serum from patients with syphilis into patients who were admitted for other medical conditions. Most of these patients were prostitutes, who were neither informed about the experiment nor asked for their consent. When some of them contracted syphilis Neisser argued that the women did not contract syphilis as a result of his serum injections but contracted the disease because they worked as prostitutes. Though the majority of his contemporary academic physicians supported him, Neisser was investigated by the Prussian public prosecutor and ultimately fined for failing to obtain consent.

In 1905 and 1906 Neisser travelled to Java, in order to study the possible transmission of syphilis from apes to humans. He later cooperated with August Paul von Wassermann (1866–1925) to develop the famous diagnostic test for detecting Treponema pallidum infections, and also in the testing of the first chemotherapeutic agent for syphilis, Salvarsan, which was discovered by his former school fellow Paul Ehrlich in 1910. In 1907, Neisser was promoted to professor ordinarius of dermatology and sexually transmitted diseases at Breslau.

As a scientific leader, Neisser was also very active. In the field of public health, he promoted vigorously preventive and educational measures to the public, and the better sanitary control of prostitutes, in order to combat venereal diseases. He was one of the founder of the Deutsche Gesellschaft zur Bekämpfung der Geschlechtskrankheiten (German Society for the Fight Against Venereal Diseases) in 1902, and of the Deutsche Dermatologische Gesellschaft (German Dermatological Society) in 1888.

Neisser died of sepsis on 30 July 1916, at the age of 61 years, in Breslau.

== Albert Neisser Lectureship ==
The Albert Neisser Lectureship has been awarded since 2005 by the Department of Dermatology at the University of Wrocław to dermatologists who have made significant clinical and research contributions to the field. Past awardees include:

Year	Name	Country
2005	Gerd Plewg	Munich, Germany
2006	Wieslaw Glinski	Warsaw, Poland
2007	Andrew Y. Finlay	Cardiff, UK
2008	Thomas Ruzicka	Munich, Germany
2009	Mariusz Wasik	Philadelphia, PA, USA
2010	Robert A. Schwartz	NJ, USA
2011	Martin M. Black	London, UK
2012	Andrzej Langner	Warsaw, Poland
2013	Earl E. Carstens	Davis, CA, USA
2014	Jorge Ocampo-Candiani	Monterrey, Mexico
2015	Annegret Kuhn	Mainz, Germany
2016	Andrzej Kaszuba	Lodz, Poland
2017	Mohammad Jaffernay	Saginaw, MI, USA
2018	George T. Reizner	Madison, WI, USA
2019	Wayne Gulliver	St. John's, NL, Canada
