= Cytokeratin =

Keratin protein

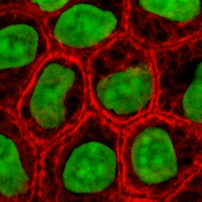
Keratin intermediate filaments in epithelial cells (red stain).

Cytokeratins are keratin proteins found in the intracytoplasmic cytoskeleton of epithelial tissue. They are an important component of intermediate filaments, which help cells resist mechanical stress. Expression of these cytokeratins within epithelial cells is largely specific to particular organs or tissues. Thus they are used clinically to identify the cell of origin of various human tumors.

== Naming ==
The term cytokeratin began to be used in the late 1970s, when the protein subunits of keratin intermediate filaments inside cells were first being identified and characterized. In 2006 a new systematic nomenclature for mammalian keratins was created, and the proteins previously called cytokeratins are simply called keratins (human epithelial category). For example, cytokeratin-4 (CK-4) has been renamed keratin-4 (K4). However, they are still commonly referred to as cytokeratins in clinical practice.

== Types ==
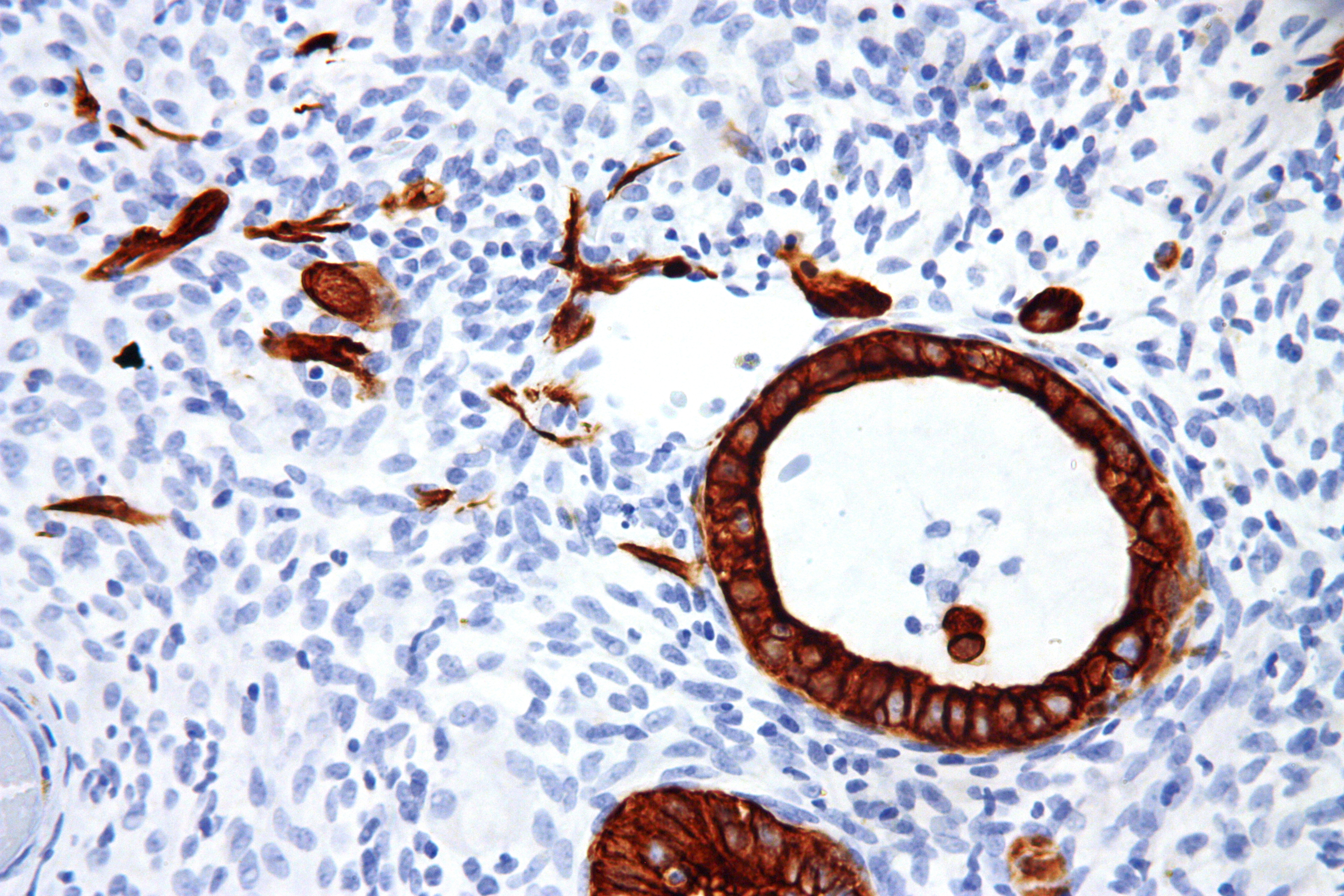
Micrograph showing low molecular weight cytokeratin (LMWCK) staining of intermediate trophoblast (placental tissue) and endometrial glands.

There are two categories of cytokeratins: the acidic type I cytokeratins and the basic or neutral type II cytokeratins. Within each category, cytokeratins are numbered in order of decreasing size, from high molecular weight (HMWCKs) to low molecular weight (LMWCKs). Cytokeratins are usually found in heterodimeric pairs of acidic and basic subunits of similar size.

| | Basic CK (Type B / Class II) | Acidic CK (Type A / Class I) |
|---|---|---|
| HMWCK "squamous keratins" | CK-1; CK-2; CK-3; CK-4; CK-5; CK-6 | CK-9; CK-10; CK-11; CK-12; CK-13; CK-14; CK-15; CK-16; CK-17 |
| LMWCK "simple keratins" | CK-7; CK-8 | CK-18; CK-19; CK-20 |

Expression of these cytokeratins is largely organ or tissue specific. The subsets of cytokeratins which an epithelial cell expresses depends mainly on the type of epithelium, the moment in the course of terminal differentiation and the stage of development. Thus a specific cytokeratin expression profile allows the identification of epithelial cells. Furthermore, this applies also to the malignant counterparts of the epithelia, (carcinomas), as the cytokeratin profile is generally retained. Thus the study of cytokeratin expression by immunohistochemistry techniques is a tool of immense value widely used for tumor diagnosis and characterization in surgical pathology.

| Cytokeratin | Sites |
|---|---|
| Cytokeratin 4 | Non-keratinized squamous epithelium, including cornea and transitional epithelium |
| Cytokeratin 7 | A subgroup of glandular epithelia and their tumors; Transitional epithelium and transitional carcinoma |
| Cytokeratin 8 | Glandular epithelia of the digestive, respiratory and urogenital tracts, both endocrine and exocrine cells, as well as mesothelial cells; Adenocarcinomas originating from those above |
| Cytokeratin 10 | Keratinized stratified epithelium; Differentiated areas of highly differentiated squamous cell carcinomas |
| Cytokeratin 13 | Non-keratinized squamous epithelia, except cornea |
| Cytokeratin 14 | Basal layer of stratified and combined epithelia |
| Cytokeratin 18 | Glandular epithelia of the digestive, respiratory, and urogenital tracts, both endocrine and exocrine cells, as well as mesothelial cells; Adenocarcinomas originating from those above |
| Cytokeratin 19 | Glandular-type epithelia; Carcinomas; Does not react with hepatocytes and hepatocellular carcinoma |
| Cytokeratin 20 | Glandular-type epithelia. Signet ring/round clear cells; GI stromal tumor (Krukenberg) |

Immunohistochemistry using the combination of cytokeratin 7 and 20 expression helps in determining the origin of tumors by putting them into one of four categories.

== Molecular biology ==
The cytokeratins are encoded by a family encompassing 30 genes. Among them, 20 are epithelial genes and the remaining 10 are specific for trichocytes.

All cytokeratin chains are composed of a central α-helix-rich domain (with a 50 to 90% sequence identity among cytokeratins of the same type and around 30% between cytokeratins of different type) with non-α-helical N- and C-terminal domains. The α-helical domain has 310-150 amino acids and comprises four segments in which a seven-residue pattern repeats. Into this repeated pattern, the first and fourth residues are hydrophobic and the charged residues show alternate positive and negative polarity, resulting in the polar residues being located on one side of the helix. This central domain of the chain provides the molecular alignment in the keratin structure and makes the chains form coiled dimers in solution.

The end-domain sequences of type I and II cytokeratin chains contain in both sides of the rod domain the subdomains V1 and V2, which have variable size and sequence. The type II also presents the conserved subdomains H1 and H2, encompassing 36 and 20 residues respectively. The subdomains V1 and V2 contain residues enriched by glycines and/or serines, the former providing the cytokeratin chain a strong insoluble character and facilitating the interaction with other molecules. These terminal domains are also important in defining the function of the cytokeratin chain characteristic of a particular epithelial cell type.

Two dimers of cytokeratin group into a keratin tetramer by anti-parallel binding. This cytokeratin tetramer is considered to be the main building block of the cytokeratin chain. By head-to-tail linking of the cytokeratin tetramers, the protofilaments are originated, which in turn intertwine in pairs to form protofibrils. Four protofibrils give place to one cytokeratin filament.

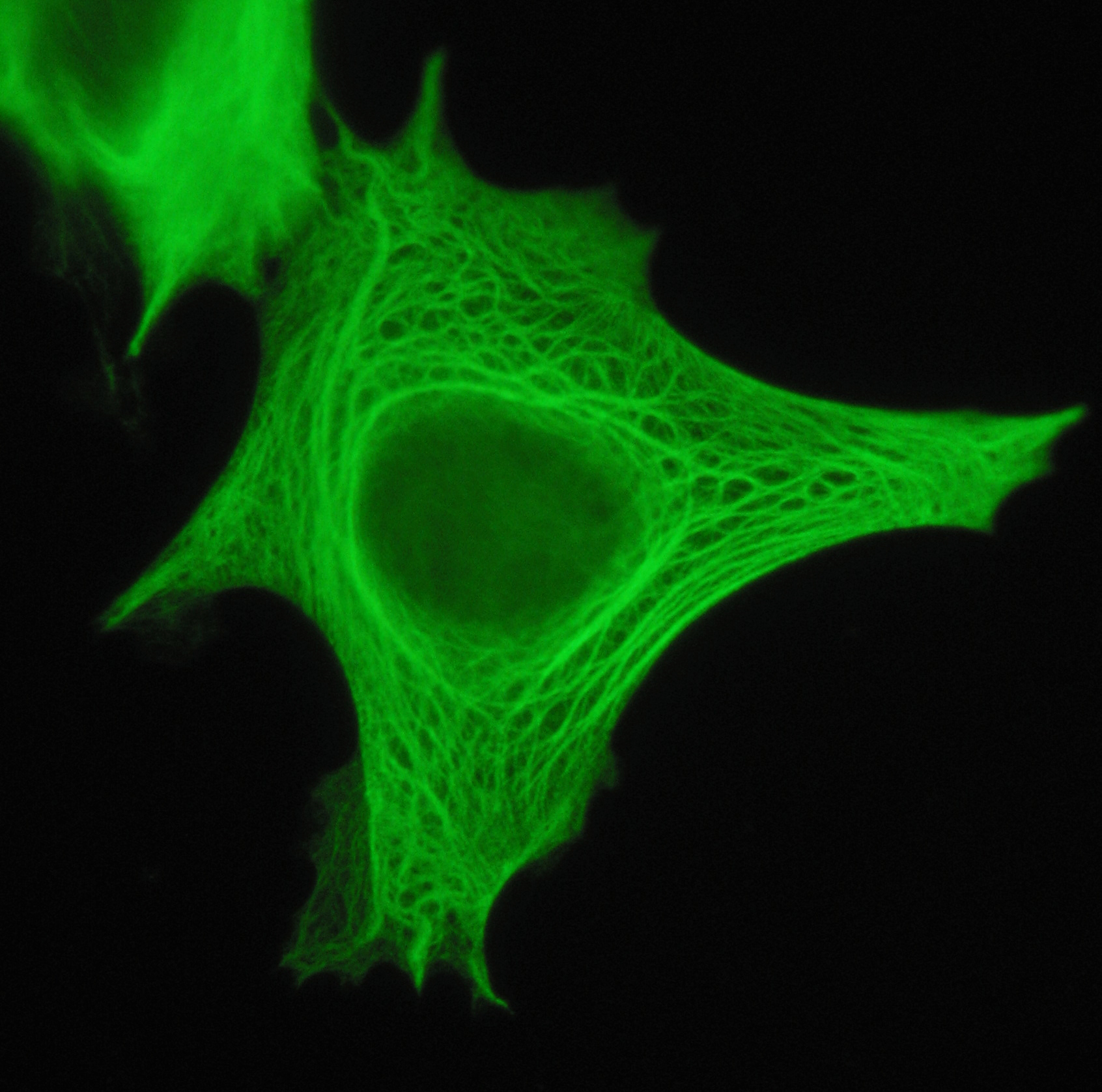
Cytokeratin filaments in the human epithelial cell

== Cell biology ==
In the cytoplasm, keratin filaments associate laterally with each other to create bundles of ~50 nm radius. The radius of these bundles is set by the interplay between long range electrostatic repulsion and short range hydrophobic attraction. These keratin bundles span a complex network which extends from the surface of the nucleus to the cell membrane. Numerous accessory proteins are involved in the genesis and maintenance of such structure.

This association between the plasma membrane and the nuclear surface provides important implications for the organization of the cytoplasm and cellular communication mechanisms. Apart from the relatively static functions provided in terms of supporting the nucleus and providing tensile strength to the cell, the cytokeratin networks undergo rapid phosphate exchanges mediated depolymerization, with important implications in the more dynamic cellular processes such as mitosis and post-mitotic period, cell movement and differentiation.

Cytokeratins interact with desmosomes and hemidesmosomes, thus collaborating to cell–cell adhesion and basal cell–underlying connective tissue connection.

The intermediate filaments of the eukaryotic cytoskeleton, which the cytokeratins are one of its three components, have been probed to associate also with the ankyrin and spectrin complex protein network that underlies the cell membrane.
