= 34βE12 =

34βE12, often written as 34betaE12 and also known as CK34βE12 and keratin 903 (CK903), is an antibody specific for high molecular weight cytokeratins 1, 5, 10 and 14.

It is sometimes, less precisely, referred to as high-molecular weight keratin (HMWK) and high-molecular weight cytokeratin (HMWCK).

== Utility ==
It is used to stain basal cells in prostatic glands; loss of basal cells is seen in prostate adenocarcinoma (the most common form of prostate cancer).

It can be used to differentiate in situ cancers of the breast; lobular carcinoma in situ (LCIS) exhibits perinuclear staining with 34βE12. Ductal carcinoma in situ (DCIS) does not stain for 34βE12.

== See also ==
- Immunohistochemistry
