= Basal-like carcinoma =

Breast cancer subtype

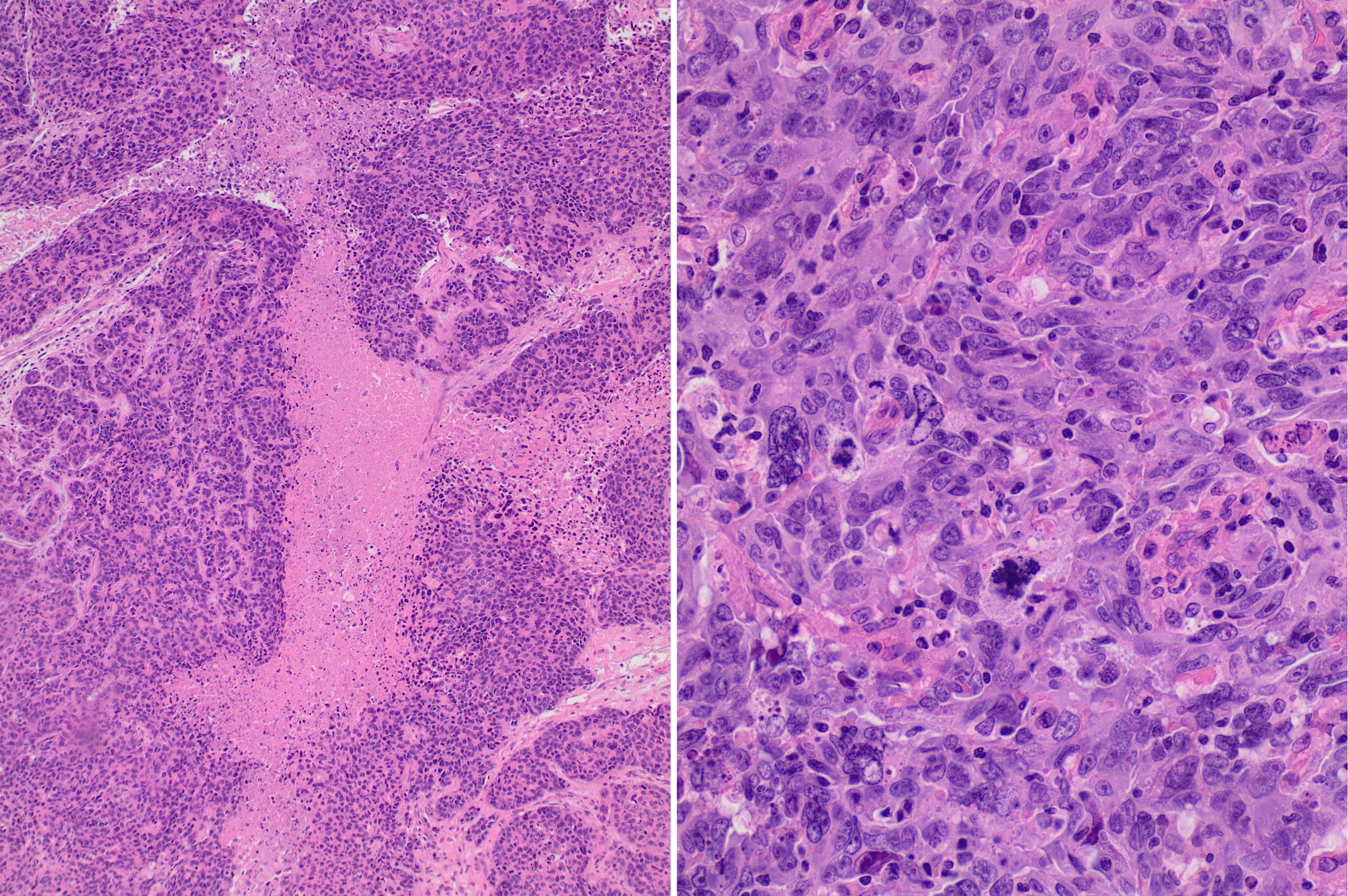
Histopathology of features often seen in basal-like breast cancer: Low magnification at left shows large geographic necroses (pink homogenous areas), and high magnification at right shows highly pleomorphic nuclei and ample mitoses. H&E stain.

The basal-like carcinoma is a recently proposed subtype of breast cancer defined by its gene expression and protein expression profile.

Breast cancer can be divided into five molecular subtypes, including luminal subtype A, luminal subtype B, normal breast-like subtype, HER-2 overexpression subtype, and basal-like subtype. Genotyping fundamentally provides breast cancer patients with improved prognosis and treatment. In all molecular subtypes, basal-like breast cancer (BLBC) is still the biggest challenge in current research due to its strong invasiveness and molecular biological characteristics.

== Epidemiology ==
BLBC is more common among young and premenopausal women in Africa and African Americans. Large sample studies based on immunohistochemistry showed that the average age of BLBC patients is 47.7 to 55 years old. Incidence of BLBC and breastfeeding were negative related. Compared with ductal breast cancer, BLBC is more common among women who have earlier menarche age; whose first-term gestational age is less than 26 years old. Women who have low economic and social status, metabolic syndrome and use contraceptives for more than one year are more likely to develop BLBC. Increased waist-hip ratio before menopause also has a significant correlation with BLBC.

== Treatment and prognosis ==
Although tumors are often larger and of later stage, basal-like subtypes are more sensitive to anthracycline-based neoadjuvant chemotherapy than luminal breast cancers. Yet, despite initial chemosensitivity, patients with basal-like subtypes have worse distant disease–free survival and overall survival than those with the luminal subtypes, with a 58% 5-year overall survival of people with basal-like carcinoma compared to 88% for those with luminal A subtype. The percentage of patients with minimal residual disease after chemotherapy is higher among basal-like than HER2+/ER− breast cancers. As an independent molecular subtype, BLBC's special biological behavior and poor prognosis is the reason for its significance in the clinical research of breast cancer. BLBC has a high proliferative activity and strong invasiveness, suggesting that it is easier for recurrence and metastasis, and the overall survival period is significantly shortened. BLBC is easier to metastasize to brain and lung through blood vessels, but less to bone and liver, suggesting that tumors have unique metastasis mechanism and once metastasis occurs, the prognosis is very poor. Although many research results need to be further confirmed, evidence suggests BLBC regardless of clinical characteristics or the treatment responses, is a group with heterogeneity.

== Molecular pathology ==
The most common histopathological type is invasive ductal carcinoma. It can also be metaplastic carcinoma, medullary carcinoma and adenoid cystic carcinoma, with high grade, high mitosis count. Central necrosis, apoptotic cells, and stroma lymphocyte reaction and a small amount of interstitial components can be seen through microscopic examination. In BLBC, p53 mutations are usually found and the expression of epidermal growth factor receptor (EGFR or HER-1) and c-KIT are usually positive. Through genetic hybridization techniques, BLBC is verified to have the most complex gene phenotypes. The relationship between BLBC and familial BRCA1-associated breast cancer has been discussed in recent years. Several studies have demonstrated that BRCA1-associated breast cancer is more likely to be a BLBC. However, there are few BRCA1 mutations in BLBC, indicating that it is likely to be epigenetic changes. Studies have reported that the negative regulatory factor of BRCA1 gene, ID4, is often highly expressed in BLBC suggesting that ID4 may play an important role in BLBC. Although the molecular biology mechanisms for BRCA1 and BRCA2 are not understood very well, more and more evidence shows that there are abnormal BRBC1 pathway existing in BLBC.

== Proliferation and metastasis ==
Studies demonstrate that BLBC has a high mitotic index and proliferation ratio. EGFR promotes cell proliferation by activating Ras/MAPK/MAPK pathways. BLBC is characterized by low expression of RB and CyclinD1 gene and high expression of E2F Transcription Factor 3 (E2F-3) as well as Cyclin E genes. The Cyclin D-CDK4/CDK6 complex phosphorylates RB and promotes cell entry into the S phase by releasing the E2F family of transcription factors (inducing CyclinE expression). Additionally, Cyclin E1 is more easily replicated in BLBC than other types of breast cancer, and its expression suggests a poor prognosis. Deletion of RB gene and overexpression of cyclin E play a significant role in the malignant proliferation of BLBC. More and more studies have shown that epithelial-mesenchymal transition (EMT) plays an important role in the invasiveness of breast cancer. EMT refers to the loss of epithelial differentiation characteristics of epithelial cells and shows the characteristics of mesenchymal differentiation, resulting in decreased cell adhesion and increased mobility of cells and allowing cancer cells to obtain infiltration and metastasis. Yang et al. believed that EMT is more likely to occur in BLBC and is stimulated by abnormal microenvironment such as hypoxia. EMT markers such as N-cadherin and vimentin are highly expressed in BLBC, while epithelial markers E-cadherin are often absent. Activation of TGF-β, Wnt, and Notch pathways in BLBC leads to the expression of EMT-related transcription factors FOXC2, Twist, Slug, Snail, and LBX1, and then resulting in down-regulation of E-cadherin and promotion of EMT. Besides, EGFR functions in motility and invasiveness by inducing Twist expression, and thus promoting EMT. It has been reported that EMT in tumors may be accompanied by an increase in neovascularization, which may accelerate the occurrence of hematogenous metastasis in cancer cells. In short, EMT played a crucial role in the transfer of BLBC.
