= Oral pigmentation =

Skin condition

Oral pigmentation is asymptomatic and does not usually cause any alteration to the texture or thickness of the affected area. The colour can be uniform or speckled and can appear solitary or as multiple lesions. Depending on the site, depth, and quantity of pigment, the appearance can vary considerably.

Oral pigmentation is found in the following places:

- Lower vermillion border (the exposed pink or reddish margin of a lip)
- Tongue
- Oral mucosa
- Gingivae
- Palate

Oral pigmentation affects about 3% of the population and is most likely seen in those with dark skin; however people with light skin have, on average, 30 local pigmented areas and in some circumstances will present intra-orally. They are more often found in females than males and the typical age at presentation is 40 years although they can appear at any age.

== Causes ==
=== Racial pigmentation ===
Oral pigmentation affects about 3% of the population and is most likely seen in those with dark skin; however, people with light skin have, on average, 30 local pigmented areas and in some circumstances will present intra-orally. They are more often found in females than males and the typical age at presentation is 40 years, although they can appear at any age.

=== Black hairy tongue ===
Black hairy tongue is a harmless condition which causes blackening pigmentation on the dorsum of the tongue. It is a very common oral condition and affects 13% of the world population. It is often due to poor oral hygiene which leads to accumulation of oral bacteria and build up of keratin on the tongue surface. Black hairy tongue can also be associated with the use of certain medications such as antibiotics, prolonged coffee/tea drinking habit, or smoking.

=== Amalgam tattoo ===
The amalgam tattoo is mostly found on the alveolar or gingival mucosa (however can sometimes found on the buccal mucosa) and is more commonly found in females and older patients. It appears as painless, blue/gray/black, nonulcerated, soft macule without any erythematous reaction surrounding it. The tattoos greatest diameter is usually less than 0.5 cm and some lesions containing larger particles may be identifiable on certain radiographs.

Some patients exhibit a long-term inflammatory response and if so they may produce discoloured, small papules. The discoloured patch may enlarge over time in patients demonstrating a strong macrophage response

Amalgam deposits can be found within bone occasionally. This can be caused during a surgical procedure e.g. tooth extraction or endodontic surgery, which has caused the material to become inadvertently dislodged from a restoration in an adjacent tooth. These deposits become blackened and can lead to blackening of the adjacent bone.

=== Peutz–Jeghers syndrome ===
The autosomal dominant disorder Peutz–Jeghers syndrome is characterized by 'intestinal hamartomatous polyps in association with mucocutaneous melanocytic macules'. These macules often vary in shades of brown, size and are confluent, Although any oral site can be affected, in almost all cases pigmented macules appear on the buccal mucosae, lips and around the mouth. Pigmented macules on the face are less common. The extent of oral involvement and degree of pigmentation varies between each individual case.

An individual who has this syndrome has a relative risk fifteen times greater of developing cancer in comparison to the general population.

In older patients, the main consequence of the syndrome is cancer. The sites mainly affected include the pancreas, stomach, lungs, colon, small intestine, uterus, breasts and the ovaries and breasts. Additionally, Peutz–Jeghers Syndrome can be associated with other reproductive site cancers including sertoli cell tumours and adenoma malignum of the cervix.

In young patients, intussusception and obstruction of the small intestinal obstruction and are the main complications, these are caused by the small intestinal location of the polyps.

=== Addison's disease ===
Addison's disease can be caused by a variety of pathological processes. It is an endocrinal disorder where there is an increased amount of adrenocorticotropic hormone (ACTH) as a result of deficient amounts of hormones being produced from the adrenal cortex. Due to this, dark pigmentation may be visible on the oral mucosa or skin. Most common oral sites include: buccal mucosa, lips, gums, hard palate or tongue. Intraoral sites are usually seen as the first sign and they usually develop prior to the skin lesions. In developing countries, this disease is often associated with tuberculosis, where the infection can lead to destruction of the adrenal gland.

==== Systemically oral melanosis can also be associated with the following; ====
- Pregnancy
- Oral contraceptive intake
- Exposure to sunlight
- HIV
- Antimalarial drug therapy

=== Kaposi's sarcoma ===
This is an intermediate neoplasm which affects the skin and mucous membranes; usually arising in patients with HIV. The stages of this type of pigmentation start from an early patch stage, to become plaque-like which then develop into larger nodules- known as the tumour stage. It is common to have oral involvement with this disease and frequently this is associated with a poor prognosis.

=== Smoker's melanosis ===
Smoker's Melanosis, benign melanocytic pigmentation of the oral mucosa, most commonly seen in the lower labial gingiva and interdental papillae of smokers. Smoking results in an increase of melanin deposit in the oral mucosa through physical thermal damage and chemical interaction between melanin and nicotine compounds, but this is not the only risk factor towards the pigmentation, it is also associated with other aetiology factors.

=== Oral melanoacanthoma ===
Oral melanoacanthoma are benign pigmented lesions due to dendritic melanocyte proliferation and superficial epithelium acanthosis. Clinically characterized by a rapidly growing macular brown lesion that appears suddenly.

=== Melanocytic nevi ===
Oral nevi or oral melanocytic nevi, are result of benign proliferations of nevus cells present either in the epithelial layer, the submucosal layer or both. Most commonly seen presentation of oral nevi are intramucosal nevi, these are dome shaped brown papules accounting for 64% of all reported case of oral nevi. Other presentation of oral nevi includes: Blue nevus, junctional nevus and compound nevus.

=== Melanotic macules ===
Melanotic macules can be found on the buccal mucosa, lip, palate, alveolar ridge and gingiva. Melanotic macules are benign pigmented lesions that are found in the oral cavity, caused by an increase in pigmentation in the basal cell layer of the epithelium and the lamina propria. Clinically presentation of melanotic macules are typically a brown, black, blue or grey area that is well circumscribed, lesions are usually less than 10 mm in diameter but can be larger in some cases. Vermillion border of the lips is the most common site to find melanotic macules.

=== Oral melanoma ===
This type of oral malignancy is very rare. It is caused by proliferation of malignant melanocytes within the connective tissues. Most common oral sites include the hard palate and gums. The presentation of oral melanoma can vary; some could be asymptomatic pigmented areas, whilst others could be rapidly growing areas of ulceration with symptoms such as, bone destruction, pain and bleeding.

To stage oral melanoma, the TNM clinical staging system is used. This stands for 'Tumor – Nodes – Metastasis'. It highlights the three stages: stage I is a primary tumor; stage II is a metastatic tumor which has spread to regional lymph nodes and; stage III is a metastatic tumor which has spread to distant sites.

== Pathogenesis ==
Many different diseases can cause melanin pigmented lesions in the mouth through

1. Increase in the number of melanocytes or melanocytosis
2. Increased melanin production with or without melanocytosis

Melanin is an endogenous pigment synthesized by melanocytes that are located in the basal layer of epithelium. Melanin is then transferred to keratinocytes in melanosomes. Nevus cells in the skin and oral mucosa also produce melanin. Oral melanosis can present as black, gray, blue or brown lesions depending on the site and amount of melanin deposition in tissues.

=== Physiological ===
Increased melanin production without increase in melanocytes

=== Peutz–Jeghers syndrome ===
Increased production of melanin without increase in number of melanocytes

=== Addison's disease ===
Decrease in blood adrenocortical hormone level causes increased levels of adrenocorticotropic hormone secreted by anterior pituitary gland. As a result, melanocyte-stimulating hormone is induced which causes oral melanosis.

=== Smoker's melanosis ===
Increased melanin production to defend against damage from tobacco smoke

=== Oral melanoacanthoma ===
Increased number of dendritic melanocytes

=== Melanocytic nevi ===
Accumulation of nevus cells at the basal layer of the epithelium or in the connective tissue or both

=== Oral melanoma ===
Increased number of malignant melanocytes

== Diagnosis ==
Diagnosis of oral pigmentation is by a complete history taken by the clinician followed by a thorough clinical examination. Management of such lesions is typically by close clinical monitoring, photographs and measuring tools. A biopsy may be indicated where the following features are present: large or new-pigmented lesions and those with a papular appearance or irregular colouration.

== Management ==
=== Physiological oral pigmentation ===
Physiological pigmentation is considered of normal variation. However, for some individuals, the brown/black discolouration may be aesthetically displeasing. It may cause embarrassment or discomfort for some, particularly when smiling or talking. Some methods used to eliminate or reduce this pigmentation include gingivectomy, laser therapy and cryosurgery. There are pros and cons for each type of management strategy.

Cryotherapy is one of the most successful and popular treatments for oral melanosis. Cryotherapy damages the tissue by freezing its internal components – thereby jeopardising the cells' optimum temperature; leading to denaturation of enzymes and proteins required for cell function. Minimum temperature needed for cell damage is cell specific, and melanocytes are very sensitive to low temperatures at −4 °C to −7 °C where cell death can occur. This procedure is relatively pain free, so local anaesthesia is generally not needed. Immediately after, slight erythema of the gingiva becomes apparent. Superficial necrosis is observed over the next few days and a whitish slough could be separated from the underlying tissue leaving a clean pink ulcer bed. Within a week, the gingiva returns to normal and is fully healed in next few weeks minus the pigmentation. In conclusion, cryotherapy has been described as the most suitable treatment options for physiological oral melanosis. It is simple yet effective method for treating oral pigmentation with minimal trauma to the patient.

Alternatively, lasers can be used to treat physiological oral melanosis. There are many different lasers available on the market to purchase, each with their own individual benefits and disadvantages. These lasers are expensive therefore, not commonly available in a hospital or clinical setting. However, lasers allow for controlled cutting with a limited depth of necrosis. Studies have shown the diode laser is a safe method and is the preferred laser when no other short pulse lasers are available. The diode laser is specific and is absorbed only by the melanin meaning more selective destruction and less damage to surrounding normal tissue with comparison to CO_{2} lasers.

=== Systemic conditions associated with oral pigmentation ===
Oral melanosis caused by systemic diseases may be the first sign a dentist or medical professional may pick up to cause suspicion for any underlying systemic disease. Most diseases are treated with the relevant medications which leads to a gradual decrease in oral melanosis. For example, Addison's disease causes hyperpigmentation in the mouth and may be noticed during an exam followed alongside other systemic symptoms. An oral biopsy alongside other relevant tests (i.e. bloods) should be taken and confirmed for diagnosis for any type of oral melanosis which you suspect to be caused by an underlying disease. For Addison's, the specific treatment option would be to treat with glucocorticoids and mineralocorticoids.

Alternatively, the continuous exposure to high concentrations of corticosteroids increases susceptibility to Cushing's syndrome which is also a cause of oral melanosis. The patterns of pigmentation are very similar to those with Addison's. The management of these depend on the severity and can be removed by surgical, radiation or drug therapy i.e. Pasierotide.

With regards to oral melanosis caused by systemic diseases, the most important thing to do is to refer the patient to their GMP if there is a suspicion of any underlying systemic cause. If suitable, then it would be appropriate to carry out the relevant investigation to come to a definitive diagnosis. From here it will be easier to manage the cause with the relevant medication or therapy.

=== Kaposi's sarcoma ===
There is a variety of different treatment options for Kaposi sarcoma. The appropriate therapy options may vary depending on the variation of disease and the patients immune status. If the lesion is localised, usually found in classical Kaposi sarcoma, and not systemic treatments can be any from lasers, cryotherapy, non-intervention, chemotherapy and immune upregulation. For generalized and systemic cases chemotherapeutic drugs are used. HAART is also a recognised treatment if the patient is known to have AIDS-related Kaposi sarcoma. For cases of iatrogenic Kaposi sarcoma any immunosuppressive medication should be stopped or reduced if able.

=== Smoker's melanosis ===
Smokers melanosis may resolve over several years following smoking cessation.

=== Oral melanoma ===
An initial biopsy of the lesion may be carried out first to determine correct diagnosis. Following this there is a number of different treatment options available. The combination used will be based on the individual patient and presenting melanoma. Surgical resection is most commonly carried out. This involves cutting out the lesion and ensuring complete removal from the oral cavity. Chemotherapy and Radiotherapy are considered first line management and they may be used in conjunction with surgery. Another option available is Immunotherapy. The aim of this is to target cells or molecules in the immune system in an effort to destroy tumours. This can be done by suppressing or stimulating the patients immune system. After treatment has been carried out patients should be seen for regular follow ups to manage any reoccurrence early and ensure complete healing following surgeries. If the melanoma has progressed extensively and metastasised, treatment, for example surgery, would be carried out in a palliative nature only.

== Epidemiology ==
Oral pigmentation also be classified as two categories, melanocytic or non-melanocytic. (Melanocytic being the genesis due to the increase in melanotic pigments and non-melanocytic origin being the genesis from non melanotic causes). The prevalence of melanocytic and non-melanocytic causes of oral melanosis was roughly 1:1.

=== Physiological ===
Oral pigmentation affects about 3% of the population and is most likely seen in those with dark skin

=== Peutz–Jeghers syndrome ===
For Peutz–Jeghers syndrome the frequency is approximately 1 case per 60,000–300,000 people in the US. Equal occurrence in both sexes and all races. Average age of diagnosis being 23 years in men and 26 years in women.

=== Smokers melanosis ===
Smoker's melanosis is present in all age groups, has no observed sex or race predilection.

=== Melanotic macule ===
For hyperplastic or neoplastic processes, the mean age of oral melanotic macule (hyperplastic- increase in malanoticpigments without an increase in malanocytes) is 43.1 years with the mean size of the lesion was about 6.8mm. The female: male ratio is 2:1 and lower lip being the most common location. For oral melanoma (neoplastic) the mean age was 53.8 years with equal ratio of female:male and most common location being in the palate or gingiva.

=== Oral melanoma ===
For oral melanoma (neoplastic lesion), the mean age was 53.8 years with equal ratio of female:male and most common location being in the palate or gingiva.

=== Cumulative frequency ===
The occurrence of oral malanosis on the cheeks were (21%), alveolar mucosa (16.6%), gingiva (11.8%). Amalgam tattoo being majority of the cases (46.3%), malanotic macules (22.9%) and nevus (20.5%).

== See also ==
- List of cutaneous conditions
- Melanocytic oral lesion
- White sponge nevus
