= Antigen retrieval =

Process of removing chemical changes

Antigen retrieval is a non-enzymatic pretreatment for immunostaining to reduce or eliminate the chemical modifications caused by formalin fixation, through high temperature heating or strong alkaline solution (non-heating).

== Background ==
In medicine, most surgically removed tissue samples are fixed in formalin (4% formaldehyde) and embedded in paraffin to preserve the morphology for review by pathologists using stains and microscopy to make a diagnosis. However, formaldehyde can induce chemical modifications that reduce the detectability of proteins (antigens) in immunohistochemistry. Antigen retrieval technique is a non-enzymatic pretreatment for immunostaining to reduce or eliminate these formalin-induced chemical modifications through high temperature heating or strong alkaline solution (non-heating). This process recovers the antigens masked by formalin fixation. As a result, it enables the successful application of immunohistochemistry on formalin fixed paraffin embedded tissue sections. Without antigen retrieval, most immunostains on formalin fixed paraffin embedded tissue sections show no staining.

Antigen retrieval was developed by Dr. Shan-Rong Shi in 1990 and published in 1991. Antigen retrieval techniques (AR) have had a profound impact on medical research and diagnostic pathology, enabling more accurate and reliable staining of tissue samples and improving the diagnostic accuracy of various diseases, including cancer. Antigen retrieval is considered as a milestone in the history of immunohistochemistry. The two primary methods of antigen retrieval are heat-induced AR and non-heating alkaline-induced AR. Both techniques received US patents.

== Heat-induced antigen retrieval ==
Heat-induced antigen retrieval is the most widely used pretreatment in immunohistochemistry for formalin fixed paraffin embedded tissue sections. It requires boiling deparaffinized formalin fixed paraffin embedded tissue sections in either water or various buffer solutions. Due to the limited application of non-heating AR and the prevalence of heat-induced AR, the term "Antigen Retrieval" (AR) is most commonly used to refer to heat-induced AR.

Biochemical studies of the chemical reaction between protein and formalin by Fraenkel—Conrat and co-workers in the 1940s indicated that cross linkages between formalin and protein can be reversed by high-temperature heating or strong alkaline treatment. This observation formed the basis for the development of AR. The mechanism of antigen retrieval is unclear. It believed to reverse cross-links, and allows for restoration of secondary of tertiary structure of the epitope.

Heat-induced antigen retrieval can be performed with microwave ovens, pressure cookers, vegetable steamers, autoclaves, or water baths.

The most important factors for the effectiveness of heat-induced antigen retrieval are the time and temperature of the heating conditions. The chemical composition and pH value of the buffer solution also contribute to the effectiveness of heat-induced antigen retrieval. Thus, the AR-immunohistochemistry protocol must be optimized for each tissue type, fixation method, and antigen using a "test battery" to maximize antigen recovery in formalin fixed paraffin embedded sections.

== Non-heating alkaline-induced antigen retrieval ==
Non-heating alkaline-induced antigen retrieval requires immersing slides in a strong alkaline solution (sodium hydroxide and methanol). It was originally developed for immunostaining on formalin-fixed, routinely acid-decalcified, celloidin-embedded human temporal bone sections. The principle of this method is also based on the study of Fraenkel—Conrat and colleagues as described above. Due to the limited application of non-heating AR, this method is not well-known.

== Enzyme digestion ==
Enzyme digestion, also referred to as protease-induced epitope retrieval by some authors, is an old technique used in immunohistochemistry for formalin fixed paraffin embedded tissue sections before the advent of AR. In enzyme digestion, enzymes such as proteinase K, trypsin, and pepsin are used to restore antibody binding to its epitope. The purported mechanism of action is the cleavage of peptides that mask the epitope, thereby restoring antigenicity.

Disadvantages of enzyme digestion include a low success rate for restoring immunoreactivity and the potential destruction of tissue morphology and the antigen of interest. After the development of AR, enzyme digestion was rarely used in immunohistochemistry for formalin fixed paraffin embedded tissue sections.

Although enzyme digestion and antigen retrieval target the same problem in immunohistochemistry, these two techniques differs in both the mode of action and effectiveness, warranting distinct nomenclature.

== Frozen section epitope retrieval ==
Frozen section epitope retrieval refers to two antigen retrieval methods designed specifically for aldehyde-fixed cryostat frozen tissue sections or cultured cells; the sodium dodecyl sulfate and heating en bloc methods.

The sodium dodecyl sulfate method requires a 5 minute pretreatment using 1% sodium dodecyl sulfate and can produce an increase in staining intensity by immunohistochemistry as well as immunofluorescence.

Heating en bloc takes tissue blocks fixated in paraformaldehyde, heats them in retrieval solutions, and then freezes them using dry ice. Heating is already used in antigen retrieval and has been proven to be widely effective, but previous heating methods have been shown to kill frozen sections. This method proved to enhance immunoreactivity for a wide range of antigens and lower the background staining in some cases.
