= White sponge nevus =

Benign lesions on the insides of the cheeks

- Other names: White sponge naevus, Cannon's disease, Hereditary leukokeratosis of mucosa, White sponge nevus of Cannon, Familial white folded dysplasia, or Oral epithelial nevus
- White sponge nevus has an autosomal dominant pattern of inheritance.
- Specialty: Oral medicine

White sponge nevus (WSN) is an extremely rare autosomal dominant condition of the oral mucosa (the mucous membrane lining of the mouth). It is caused by one or more mutations in genes coding for keratin, which causes a defect in the normal process of keratinization of the mucosa. This results in lesions which are thick, white and velvety on the inside of the cheeks within the mouth. Usually, these lesions are present from birth or develop during childhood. The condition is benign and usually requires no treatment. WSN can, however, predispose affected individuals to over-growth/imbalance of the oral microbiota, which may require antibiotic and/or antifungal treatment.

== Signs and symptoms ==
WSN presents most commonly in the mouth, as thickened, bilateral, symmetrical white plaques with a spongy, corrugated or velvety texture. Lesions are typically present on the buccal mucosa, but may also affect the labial mucosa, alveolar ridge, floor of the mouth, ventral surface of the tongue, lip vermillion or soft palate. The gingival margin and dorsum of the tongue are almost never affected. Less commonly, sites outside the mouth are affected, including the nasal, esophageal, laryngeal, anal and genital mucosae. Being a genetic disorder, it is de-facto present at birth, but the condition may not be observed or diagnosed until childhood or later. Apart from the appearance of the affected areas, there are usually no other signs or symptoms.

== Pathophysiology ==
WSN is caused by a mutation of the keratin 4 or keratin 13 genes, located respectively at human chromosomes 12q13 and 17q21-q22. The condition is inherited in an autosomal dominant manner. This indicates that the defective gene responsible for a disorder is located on an autosome (chromosomes 12 and 17 are autosomes), and only one copy of the defective gene is sufficient to cause the disorder, when inherited from a parent who has the disorder.

== Diagnosis ==
=== Differential diagnosis ===
It is often mistaken for leukoplakia, therefore a positive diagnosis is important in order to eliminate serious/malignant pathologies.

=== Classification ===
The ICD-10 lists WSN under "other congenital malformations of mouth". It could be classified as a skin condition, or more precisely as a genodermatosis (a genetically determined skin disorder).

== Treatment ==
There are no specific treatments for WSN, and once diagnosed, further medical attention may not be required. However, the abnormal texture of mucosae (particularly the oral mucosae) is known to predispose some affected individuals to over-growth or imbalance of the normal oral flora (i.e. bacterial and fungal organisms normally present in the oral cavity). The extreme rarity of the condition (estimated at 1 in 200,000 people) means that clinical evaluation of treatment options is based on very small sample sizes, often a single patient. Some affected individuals rarely or never experience problematic symptoms, while others report sporadic/idiopathic thickening and spreading of the white plaques within their oral cavity. Across the primary literature there is clinical evidence to support topical or systemic antibiotic or antifungal treatment in cases where symptoms have flared-up.

== See also ==
- Oral melanosis
- List of cutaneous conditions caused by mutations in keratins
- Hereditary benign intraepithelial dyskeratosis
