= Epidermolysis bullosa simplex =

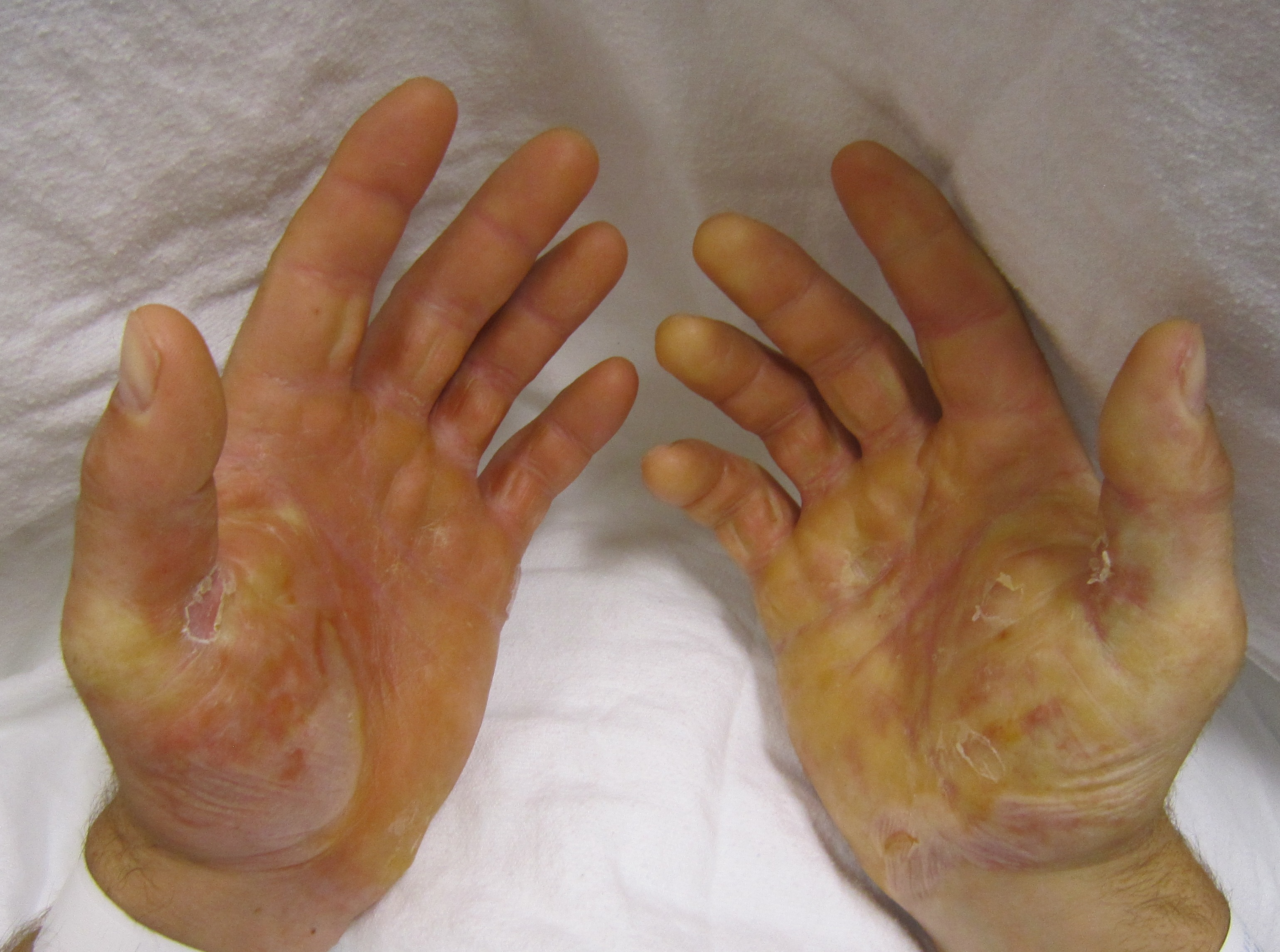
- Epidermolysis bullosa simplex
- Specialty: Medical genetics

Epidermolysis bullosa simplex (EBS) is a disorder resulting from mutations in the genes encoding keratin 5 or keratin 14. It is one of the major forms of epidermolysis bullosa, a group of genetic conditions that cause the skin to be very fragile and to blister easily.

== Signs and symptoms ==
EBS causes blister formation at the dermal-epidermal junction. The skin blisters easily, even from very minor friction and rubbing.

== Cause ==
Epidermolysis bullosa simplex is caused by genetic mutations that prevent the proper formation of protein structures in the skin’s epidermis. The proteins of the outer epidermis do not bond properly with those of the inner dermis layer (dermal-epidermal junction). The affected genes, KRT5 and the KRT14, which are responsible for the creation of keratin 5 and keratin 14 proteins respectively, are tied to the four major types of epidermolysis bullosa simplex. However, a small number of epidermolysis bullosa simplex patients do not have mutations in their KRT5 and KRT14 genes. Mutations in the PLEC gene are also being researched, specifically in the gene’s role in the Ogna form of epidermolysis bullosa simplex. The PLEC gene is responsible for the formation of plectin, another skin protein that attaches the epidermis to the skin’s deeper layers.

== Diagnosis ==
=== Classification ===
Epidermolysis bullosa simplex may be divided into multiple types:

Type	Locus & Gene	OMIM
Epidermolysis bullosa simplex with migratory circinate erythema	12q13 (KRT5)	609352
Epidermolysis bullosa simplex with mottled pigmentation. Associated with a recurrent mutation in KRT14.	12q13 (KRT5)	131960
Epidermolysis bullosa simplex, autosomal recessive	17q12-q21 (KRT14)	601001
Generalized epidermolysis bullosa simplex Also known as "Koebner variant of generalized epidermolysis bullosa simplex", presents at birth to early infancy with a predilection for the hands, feet, and extremities, and palmar-plantar hyperkeratosis and erosions may be present.	17q12-q21 (KRT5), 12q13 (KRT14)	131900
Localized epidermolysis bullosa simplex Also known as "Weber–Cockayne syndrome" and "Weber–Cockayne variant of generalized epidermolysis bullosa simplex", is characterized by onset in childhood or later in life, and is the most common variant of epidermolysis bullosa simplex.	17q12-q21 (KRT5), 17q11-qter, 12q13 (KRT14)	131800
Epidermolysis bullosa herpetiformis Also known as "Dowling-Meara epidermolysis bullosa simplex", presents at birth with a generalized distribution, often with oral mucosa involvement and variable lesions in infancy.	17q12-q21 (KRT5), 12q13 (KRT14)	131760
Epidermolysis bullosa simplex with muscular dystrophy A rare clinical entity, and is the only epidermolytic epidermolysis bullosa described that is not caused by a keratin mutation, presenting as a generalized intraepidermal blistering similar to the Koebner variant of generalized epidermolysis bullosa simplex, but also associated with adult onset muscular dystrophy.	8q24 (PLEC1)	226670
Epidermolysis bullosa simplex with pyloric atresia	8q24 (PLEC1)	612138
Epidermolysis bullosa simplex of Ogna Has onset in infancy, presenting with seasonal blistering on acral areas during summer months.	8q24 (PLEC1)	131950

== Management ==
- No cure for EB
- Treat symptoms
- Protect skin, stop blister formation, promote healing
- Prevent complications
- Necessary treatment: use oral and topical steroid for healing and prevent complication
- Maintain cool environment, avoid overheating and decreases friction

== See also ==
- Epidermolysis bullosa
- List of cutaneous conditions caused by mutations in keratins
