= Keratin 4 =

Protein found in humans

KRT4

Identifiers
- Aliases: KRT4, CK-4, CK4, CYK4, K4, WSN1, Keratin 4
- External IDs: OMIM: 123940; MGI: 96701; GeneCards: KRT4

Gene location (Human)
Chr.	Chromosome 12 (human)
Band	12q13.13	Start	52,806,549 bp
Band	12q13.13	End	52,814,116 bp

Gene location (Mouse)
Chr.	Chromosome 15 (mouse)
Band	15 F2|15 57.13 cM	Start	101,826,970 bp
Band	15 F2|15 57.13 cM	End	101,833,170 bp
RNA expression pattern
Bgee	Human / Mouse (ortholog); Top expressed in: mucosa of pharynx; oral cavity; body of tongue; palpebral conjunctiva; superior surface of tongue; buccal mucosa cell; amniotic fluid; nasal epithelium; gums; epithelium of nasopharynx / Top expressed in: superior surface of tongue; esophagus; conjunctival fornix; condyle; molar; fossa; cornea; ciliary body; corneal stroma; stomach; More reference expression data
BioGPS	n/a
Gene ontology
Molecular function	protein binding; structural molecule activity
Cellular component	cell surface; intermediate filament cytoskeleton; keratin filament; intermediate filament; nucleus; cytosol
Biological process	epithelial cell differentiation; cytoskeleton organization; negative regulation of epithelial cell proliferation; keratinization; cornification
Sources:Amigo / QuickGO
Orthologs
Databases	NCBI: entry; OMA: entry
Species	Human	Mouse
Entrez	3851	16682
Ensembl	ENSG00000170477	ENSMUSG00000059668
UniProt	P19013	P07744
RefSeq (mRNA)	NM_002272	NM_008475
RefSeq (protein)	NP_002263	NP_032501
Location (UCSC)	Chr 12: 52.81 – 52.81 Mb	Chr 15: 101.83 – 101.83 Mb
PubMed search
- Wikidata
View/Edit Human	View/Edit Mouse

Keratin, type I cytoskeletal 4 also known as cytokeratin-4 (CK-4) or keratin-4 (K4) is a protein that in humans is encoded by the KRT4 gene.

Keratin 4 is a type II cytokeratin. It is specifically found in differentiated layers of the mucosal and esophageal epithelia together with keratin 13. Mutations in the genes encoding this protein have been associated with White Sponge Nevus, characterized by oral, esophageal, and anal leukoplakia.
