= Keratin 13 =

Protein found in humans

KRT13

Identifiers
- Aliases: KRT13, CK13, K13, WSN2, keratin 13
- External IDs: OMIM: 148065; MGI: 101925; GeneCards: KRT13

Gene location (Human)
Chr.	Chromosome 17 (human)
Band	17q21.2	Start	41,500,981 bp
Band	17q21.2	End	41,505,705 bp

Gene location (Mouse)
Chr.	Chromosome 11 (mouse)
Band	11 D|11 63.41 cM	Start	100,008,153 bp
Band	11 D|11 63.41 cM	End	100,012,392 bp
RNA expression pattern
Bgee	Human / Mouse (ortholog); Top expressed in: mucosa of pharynx; oral cavity; gums; gingival epithelium; body of tongue; buccal mucosa cell; palpebral conjunctiva; vulva; superior surface of tongue; cervix epithelium / Top expressed in: superior surface of tongue; esophagus; corneal stroma; molar; conjunctival fornix; umbilical cord; lip; cervix; oral mucosa; middle ear; More reference expression data
BioGPS	n/a
Gene ontology
Molecular function	structural molecule activity; protein binding
Cellular component	intermediate filament cytoskeleton; keratin filament; extracellular exosome; intermediate filament; nucleus; cytosol
Biological process	cellular response to retinoic acid; response to radiation; cytoskeleton organization; tongue morphogenesis; keratinization; cornification
Sources:Amigo / QuickGO
Orthologs
Databases	NCBI: entry; OMA: entry
Species	Human	Mouse
Entrez	3860	16663
Ensembl	ENSG00000171401	ENSMUSG00000044041
UniProt	P13646	P08730
RefSeq (mRNA)	NM_153490; NM_002274	NM_010662; NM_001313949
RefSeq (protein)	NP_002265; NP_705694	NP_001300878; NP_034792
Location (UCSC)	Chr 17: 41.5 – 41.51 Mb	Chr 11: 100.01 – 100.01 Mb
PubMed search
- Wikidata
View/Edit Human	View/Edit Mouse

Keratin 13 (or cytokeratin 13) is a protein that in humans is encoded by the KRT13 gene.

Keratin 13 is a type I cytokeratin, it is paired with keratin 4 and found in the suprabasal layers of non-cornified stratified epithelia. Mutations in the gene encoding this protein and keratin 4 have been associated with the autosomal dominant disorder White Sponge Nevus.
