= Hereditary benign intraepithelial dyskeratosis =

Human disease

Hereditary benign intraepithelial dyskeratosis is a rare autosomal dominant disease of the conjunctiva and the oral mucosa caused by a duplication of chromosome 4q35. In the mouth it appears similar to white sponge nevus, with painless, diffuse, folded and spongy white plaques. In the eye it appears as gelatinous plaques on bulbar perilimbal conjunctiva.
