= Keratin 10 =

Protein found in humans

KRT10

Identifiers
- Aliases: KRT10, BCIE, BIE, CK10, EHK, K10, KPP, keratin 10
- External IDs: OMIM: 148080; MGI: 96685; GeneCards: KRT10
Available structures
PDB	Ortholog search: PDBe RCSB
PDB	List of PDB id codes 4F1Z, 3ASW, 4ZRY

Gene location (Human)
Chr.	Chromosome 17 (human)
Band	17q21.2	Start	40,818,117 bp
Band	17q21.2	End	40,822,614 bp

Gene location (Mouse)
Chr.	Chromosome 11 (mouse)
Band	11 D|11 62.92 cM	Start	99,276,080 bp
Band	11 D|11 62.92 cM	End	99,280,190 bp
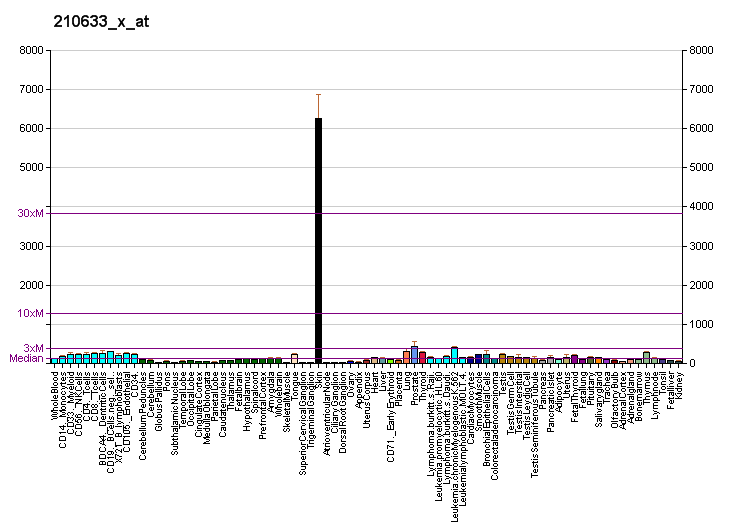

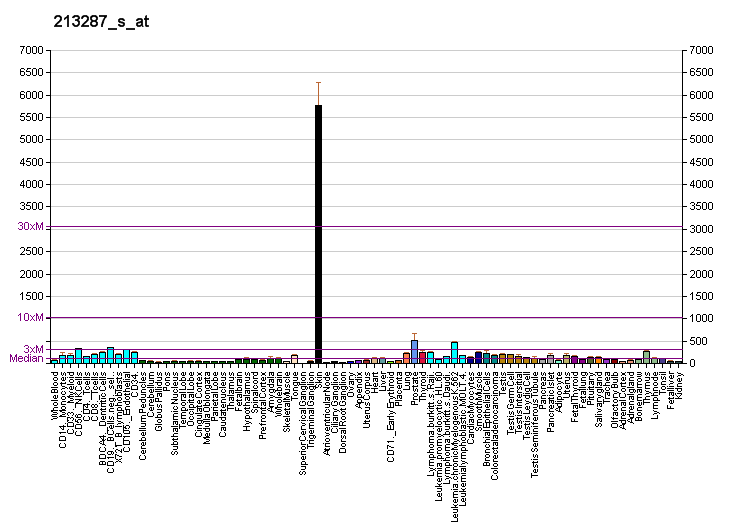

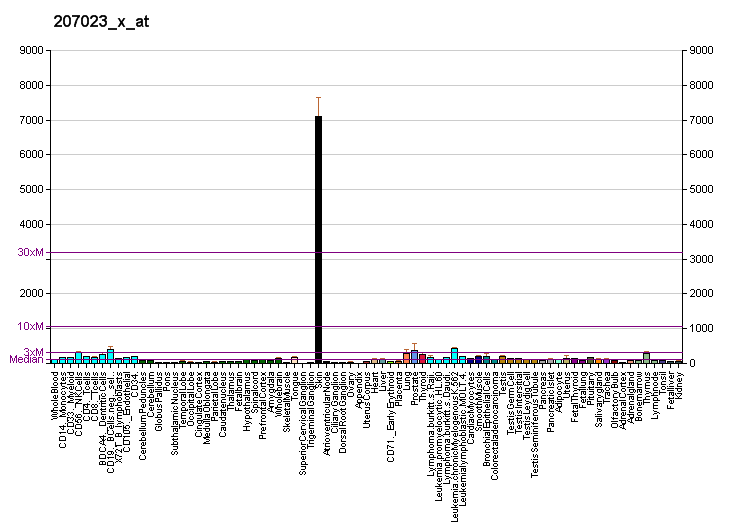
RNA expression pattern
Bgee	Human / Mouse (ortholog); Top expressed in: skin of thigh; skin of arm; vulva; nipple; human penis; skin of hip; skin of abdomen; gums; gingival epithelium; sperm / Top expressed in: skin of external ear; lip; condyle; skin of abdomen; umbilical cord; skin of back; human fetus; fossa; saccule; otic placode; More reference expression data
BioGPS	More reference expression data
Gene ontology
Molecular function	structural molecule activity; structural constituent of skin epidermis; protein heterodimerization activity; protein binding
Cellular component	cytoplasm; extracellular exosome; intermediate filament; membrane; nucleus; extracellular space; cytosol; cornified envelope; extracellular region; cell surface
Biological process	keratinocyte differentiation; keratinization; cornification; peptide cross-linking; positive regulation of epidermis development; protein heterotetramerization
Sources:Amigo / QuickGO
Orthologs
Databases	NCBI: entry; OMA: entry
Species	Human	Mouse
Entrez	3858	16661
Ensembl	ENSG00000186395	ENSMUSG00000019761
UniProt	P13645	P02535
RefSeq (mRNA)	NM_000421; NM_001379366	NM_010660
RefSeq (protein)	NP_000412; NP_001366295	NP_034790
Location (UCSC)	Chr 17: 40.82 – 40.82 Mb	Chr 11: 99.28 – 99.28 Mb
PubMed search
- Wikidata
View/Edit Human	View/Edit Mouse

Keratin, type I cytoskeletal 10 also known as cytokeratin-10 (CK-10) or keratin-10 (K10) is a protein that in humans is encoded by the KRT10 gene. Keratin 10 is a type I keratin.

== Function ==
Keratin-10 is a member of the type I (acidic) cytokeratin family, which belongs to the superfamily of intermediate filament (IF) proteins. Keratins are heteropolymeric structural proteins which form the intermediate filament. These filaments, along with actin microfilaments and microtubules, compose the cytoskeleton of epithelial cells. Mutations in this gene are associated with epidermolytic hyperkeratosis. This gene is located within a cluster of keratin family members on chromosome 17q21.

== Interactions ==
Keratin 10 has been shown to interact with AKT1.

== See also ==
- 34βE12 (keratin 903)
