= Metaplastic carcinoma =

Group of cancers

Metaplastic carcinoma, otherwise known as metaplastic breast cancer (MBC), is a heterogeneous group of cancers that exhibit varied patterns of metaplasia and differentiation along multiple cell lines. This rare and aggressive form of breast cancer is characterized as being composed of a mixed group of neoplasms containing both glandular and non-glandular patterns with epithelial and/or mesenchymal components. It accounts for fewer than 1% of all breast cancer diagnoses. It is most closely associated with invasive ductal carcinoma of no special type (IDC), and shares similar treatment approaches. Relative to IDC, MBC generally has higher histological grade and larger tumor size at time of diagnosis, with a lower incidence of axillary lymph node involvement. MBC tumors are typically estrogen receptor (ER), progesterone receptor (PR), and human epidermal growth factor-2 (HER-2) negative, meaning hormone therapy is generally not an effective treatment option, which correlates to a relatively poor prognosis. MBC was first recognized as a distinct pathological entity in 2000 by the World Health Organization.

== Classification ==
Owing to its relatively recent pathological distinction, multiple classification systems have been adopted for MBC among different organizations and research groups. The World Health Organization classifies MBC under two categories: epithelial-type and mixed-type. The epithelial-type is further classified as squamous cell carcinoma, adenocarcinoma with spindle cell differentiation, and adenosquamous carcinoma. The mixed-type is further classified as carcinoma with chondroid metaplasia, carcinoma with osseous metaplasia, and carcinosarcoma. Wargotz et al. proposed a classification system for MBC according to its cytopathological features. These classifications are spindle cell, squamous cells, matrix-producing, carcinosarcoma, and MBC with osteoclastic giant cell. Another research group, Oberman et al., proposed a classification system consisting of spindle cell carcinoma, invasive ductal carcinoma with extensive squamous metaplasia, and invasive ductal carcinoma with pseudosarcomatous metaplasia. The lack of consensus between these various classification systems for MBC has led to complications in both clinical practice and research studies.

== Risk factors ==
In most MBC cases, patients are women over the age of 50, indicating that age is a major factor in determining the risk of developing MBC. Genetics are another primary risk factor for developing MBC. Genetic mutations and family history both correlate to higher risk.

== Signs and symptoms ==
The most commonly presenting symptom of MBC is a rapidly growing, palpable mass of the breast. If the tumor has metastasized, more severe symptoms will be presented, depending on the site of metastasis.

== Diagnosis ==
Mammography is a standard diagnostic tool for MBC, where the tumors will typically display as a high-density mass. However, they can also mimic IDCs as well as benign lesions in the mammogram. Sonography is also often used to help diagnose MBC, where solid and cystic components may be observed. This is related to necrosis and cystic degeneration. In fine-needle aspiration (FNA) smears, only 57% of cases show ductal carcinoma and metaplastic components. Consequently, roughly half of MBC tumors cannot be diagnosed by FNA. Pathologic tissue diagnosis is therefore essential to distinguish MBC from other breast cancers in order to institute proper and prompt treatment. This is achieved using immunohistochemistry with a cytokeratin panel to distinguish such cases from phyllodes tumors, primary sarcomas, and fibromatoses.

== Prognosis ==
The prognosis of MBC can vary between different sub-classifications, which, given the heterogeneity of classification systems, makes assigning prognoses difficult. However, the prognosis for MBC is generally poor. Predictors associated with worse prognosis of MBC include age younger than 39 years at presentation, tumor invasion of the skin, and squamous cell carcinoma spread to the lymph nodes. The 5-year survival rate for MBC varies by classification, and ranges from 49% in the most deadly classifications to 64%.

== Treatment ==
Despite the range of classifications of MBC, treatment options are standard with other breast cancers. If the tumor is diagnosed early, breast-saving surgery could be an option, although this is relatively uncommon. In non-metastatic MBC, the most common treatment is mastectomy. If the tumor is metastatic, surgery is no longer a viable option, and treatment generally defaults to aggressive chemotherapy. Because MBC tumors are typically triple-negative, hormone therapy is not usually an option for treatment. This is directly related to its relatively poor prognosis.
