= Keratin 5 =

Protein found in humans

KRT5

Identifiers
- Aliases: KRT5, CK5, DDD, DDD1, EBS2, K5, KRT5A, keratin 5, EBS2E, EBS2B, EBS2C, EBS1, EBS2A, EBS2F, EBS2D
- External IDs: OMIM: 148040; MGI: 96702; GeneCards: KRT5
Available structures
PDB	Ortholog search: PDBe RCSB
PDB	List of PDB id codes 3TNU

Gene location (Human)
Chr.	Chromosome 12 (human)
Band	12q13.13	Start	52,514,575 bp
Band	12q13.13	End	52,520,530 bp

Gene location (Mouse)
Chr.	Chromosome 15 (mouse)
Band	15 F2|15 56.98 cM	Start	101,615,505 bp
Band	15 F2|15 56.98 cM	End	101,621,333 bp
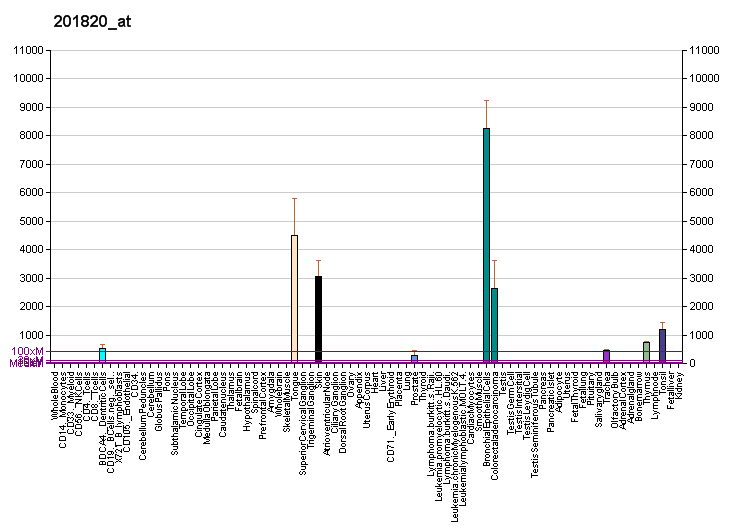
RNA expression pattern
Bgee	Human / Mouse (ortholog); Top expressed in: gums; mucosa of pharynx; gingival epithelium; nipple; skin of abdomen; skin of arm; skin of thigh; vulva; human penis; skin of hip / Top expressed in: lip; molar; skin of external ear; conjunctival fornix; skin of abdomen; esophagus; cornea; skin of back; mucosa of urinary bladder; transitional epithelium of urinary bladder; More reference expression data
BioGPS	More reference expression data
Gene ontology
Molecular function	scaffold protein binding; structural constituent of cytoskeleton; protein binding; structural molecule activity
Cellular component	cytoplasm; cytosol; plasma membrane; keratin filament; extracellular exosome; intermediate filament; membrane; mitochondrion; nucleus
Biological process	hemidesmosome assembly; epidermis development; cytoskeleton organization; keratinization; cornification
Sources:Amigo / QuickGO
Orthologs
Databases	NCBI: entry; OMA: entry
Species	Human	Mouse
Entrez	3852	110308
Ensembl	ENSG00000186081	ENSMUSG00000061527
UniProt	P13647	Q922U2
RefSeq (mRNA)	NM_000424	NM_027011
RefSeq (protein)	NP_000415	NP_081287
Location (UCSC)	Chr 12: 52.51 – 52.52 Mb	Chr 15: 101.62 – 101.62 Mb
PubMed search
- Wikidata
View/Edit Human	View/Edit Mouse

Keratin 5, also known as KRT5, K5, or CK5, is a protein that is encoded in humans by the KRT5 gene. It dimerizes with keratin 14 and forms the intermediate filaments (IF) that make up the cytoskeleton of basal epithelial cells. This protein is involved in several diseases including epidermolysis bullosa simplex and breast and lung cancers.

== Structure ==
Keratin 5, like other members of the keratin family, is an intermediate filament protein. These polypeptides are characterized by a 310 residue central rod domain that consists of four alpha helix segments (helix 1A, 1B, 2A, and 2B) connected by three short linker regions (L1, L1-2, and L2). The ends of the central rod domain, which are called the helix initiation motif (HIM) and the helix termination motif (HTM), are highly conserved. They are especially important for helix stabilization, heterodimer formation, and filament formation. Lying on either side of the central rod are variable, non-helical head and tail regions which protrude from the IF surface and provide specificity to different IF polypeptides.

IF central rods contain heptad repeats (repeating seven residue patterns) of hydrophobic resides that allow two different IF proteins to intertwine into a coiled-coil formation via hydrophobic interactions. These heterodimers are formed between specific pairs of type I (acidic) and type II (basic) keratin. K5, a type II keratin, pairs with the type I keratin K14. The coiled-coil dimers undergo stepwise assembly and combine in an antiparallel manner, forming end-to-end interactions with other coiled-coils to form large 10 nm intermediate filaments.

== Function ==
Keratin 5 (and K14) are expressed primarily in basal keratinocytes in the epidermis, specifically in the stratified epithelium lining the skin and digestive tract. Keratin intermediate filaments make up the cytoskeletal scaffold within epithelial cells, which contributes to the cell architecture and provides the cells with the ability to withstand mechanical, and non-mechanical, stresses. K5/K14 keratin pairs are able to undergo extensive bundling due to the non-helical tail of K15 acting as a weak cross-linker at the intermediate filament surface. This bundling increases the elasticity, and therefore the mechanical resilience, of the intermediate filaments.

K5/K14 intermediate filaments are anchored to the desmosomes of basal cells via desmoplakin and plakophilin-1, connecting the cells to their neighbours. At the hemidesmosome, plectin and BPAG1 associate with transmembrane proteins α6β4 integrin, a type of cell adhesion molecule, and BP180/collagen XVII, linking K5/K14 filaments in the basal cells to the basal lamina.

== Clinical relevance ==
=== Epidermolysis bullosa simplex ===
Epidermolysis bullosa simplex (EBS) is an inherited skin blistering disorder associated with mutations in either K5 or K14. EBS-causing mutations are primarily missense mutations, but a small number of cases arise from insertions or deletions. Their mechanism of action is dominant negative interference, with the mutated keratin proteins interfering with the structure and integrity of the cytoskeleton. This cytoskeletal disorganization also leads to a loss of anchorage to the hemidesmosomes and desmosomes, causing basal cells to lose their linkage with the basal lamina and each other.

The severity of EBS has been observed to be dependent upon the position of the mutation within the protein, as well as the type of keratin (K5 or K14) that contains the mutation. Mutations that occur at either of the two 10-15 residue “hotspot” regions located on either end of the central rod domain (HIM and HTM) tend to coincide with more severe forms of EBS, whereas mutations at other spots usually result in milder symptoms. Since the “hotspot” regions contain the initiation and termination sequences of the alpha-helical rod, mutations at these spots usually have a larger effect on helix stabilization and heterodimer formation. Additionally, mutations in K5 tend to result in more severe symptoms than mutations in K14, possibly due to greater steric interference.

=== Cancer ===
Keratin 5 serves as a biomarker for several different types of cancer, including breast and lung cancers. It is often tested in conjunction with keratin 6, using CK5/6 antibodies, which target both keratin forms.

Basal-like breast cancers tend to have poorer outcomes than other types of breast cancer due to a lack of targeted therapies. These breast cancers do not express human epidermal growth factor receptor-2 or receptors for estrogen or progesterone, making them immune to Trastuzumab/Herceptin and hormonal therapies, which are very effective against other breast cancer types. Due to the fact that K5 expression is only seen in basal cells, it serves as an important biomarker for screening patients with basal-like breast cancers to ensure that they are not receiving ineffective treatment.

Studies on lung cancer have also shown that squamous cell carcinomas give rise to tumors with elevated K5 levels, and that they are more likely to arise from stem cells expressing K5 than from those cells without K5 expression. K5 also serves as a marker of mesothelioma, and can be used to distinguish mesothelioma from pulmonary adenocarcinoma. Similarly, it can be used to distinguish papilloma, which is positive for K5, from papillary carcinoma, which is K5 negative. It can also serve as a marker of basal cell carcinoma, transitional cell carcinoma, salivary gland tumors, and thymoma.

The expression of K5 is linked to the intermediate phenotype of cells undergoing the epithelial-mesenchymal transition (EMT). This process has a large role in tumor progression and metastasis since it helps enable tumor cells to travel throughout the body and colonize distant sites. K5 may therefore be useful in the identification of basal cell metastases.

== See also ==
- Intermediate filament
- Keratin
- Keratin 14
- Cytoskeleton
- Epidermolysis bullosa simplex
- Basal-like carcinoma
