= Keratin 14 =

Protein found in humans

KRT14

Identifiers
- Aliases: KRT14, CK14, EBS3, EBS4, K14, NFJ, keratin 14, EBS1D, EBS1, EBS1B, EBS1A, EBS1C
- External IDs: OMIM: 148066; MGI: 96688; GeneCards: KRT14
Available structures
PDB	Ortholog search: PDBe RCSB
PDB	List of PDB id codes 3TNU

Gene location (Human)
Chr.	Chromosome 17 (human)
Band	17q21.2	Start	41,582,279 bp
Band	17q21.2	End	41,586,895 bp

Gene location (Mouse)
Chr.	Chromosome 11 (mouse)
Band	11 63.43 cM|11 D	Start	100,093,988 bp
Band	11 63.43 cM|11 D	End	100,098,374 bp
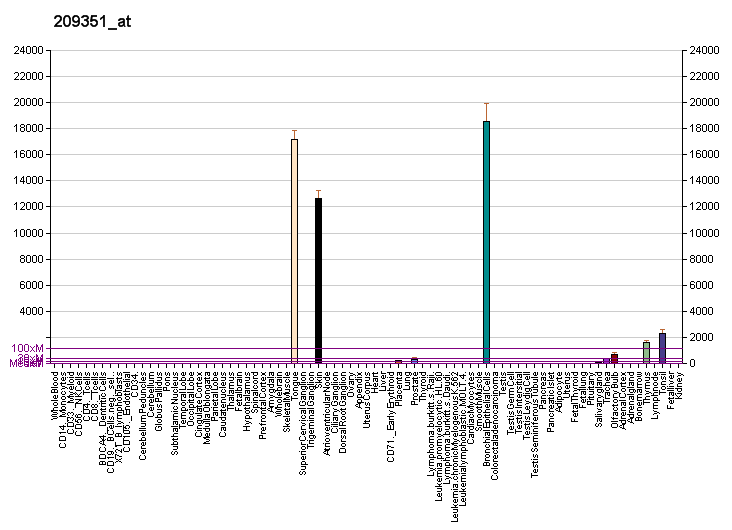
RNA expression pattern
Bgee	Human / Mouse (ortholog); Top expressed in: gingival epithelium; skin of arm; skin of thigh; nipple; vulva; human penis; skin of hip; hair follicle; skin of abdomen; body of tongue / Top expressed in: skin of external ear; lip; molar; skin of abdomen; skin of back; esophagus; cervix; conjunctival fornix; cornea; umbilical cord; More reference expression data
BioGPS	More reference expression data
Gene ontology
Molecular function	structural constituent of cytoskeleton; protein binding; keratin filament binding; structural molecule activity
Cellular component	cytoplasm; cytosol; keratin filament; extracellular exosome; intermediate filament; intracellular anatomical structure; nucleus; cell periphery; basal part of cell
Biological process	response to ionizing radiation; hemidesmosome assembly; hair cycle; ageing; response to zinc ion; epithelial cell differentiation; intermediate filament bundle assembly; epidermis development; keratinization; cornification
Sources:Amigo / QuickGO
Orthologs
Databases	NCBI: entry; OMA: entry
Species	Human	Mouse
Entrez	3861	16664
Ensembl	ENSG00000186847	ENSMUSG00000045545
UniProt	P02533	Q61781
RefSeq (mRNA)	NM_000526	NM_016958; NM_001313956; NM_001313957
RefSeq (protein)	NP_000517	NP_001300885; NP_001300886; NP_058654
Location (UCSC)	Chr 17: 41.58 – 41.59 Mb	Chr 11: 100.09 – 100.1 Mb
PubMed search
- Wikidata
View/Edit Human	View/Edit Mouse

Keratin 14 is a member of the type I keratin family of intermediate filament proteins. Keratin 14 was the first type I keratin sequence determined. Keratin 14 is also known as cytokeratin-14 (CK-14) or keratin-14 (KRT14). In humans it is encoded by the KRT14 gene.

Keratin 14 is usually found as a heterodimer with type II keratin 5 and form the cytoskeleton of epithelial cells.

== Pathology ==
Mutations in the genes for these keratins are associated with epidermolysis bullosa simplex and dermatopathia pigmentosa reticularis, both of which are autosomal dominant mutations.

== See also ==
- 34βE12 (keratin 903)
