= Hermann Werner Siemens =

German dermatologist

Hermann Werner Siemens (20 August 1891 (Charlottenberg) -1969) was a German dermatologist who first described multiple skin diseases and was one of the inventors of the twin study. Siemens' work in twin studies is influential in modern genetics and is used to address the environmental and genetic impacts upon traits. Siemens was involved in racial hygiene and affiliated with the Nazi Party.

== Early life and career ==
Siemens studied at the Friedrich Wilhelm University of Berlin and the Ludwig-Maximilians-Universität München, receiving his doctorate in 1918.

Siemens studied under J. Jadssohn in Breslau and von Zumbusch at the Ludwig-Maximilians-Universität München. He became well known for his twin studies and work on genetics in dermatology. In 1929, Siemens was appointed as the first professor of the new dermatology department at Leiden University. There he continued researching genetics, but his department worked mainly as a clinic, where he and his team carried out clinical trials. These included research on the topical "right-left-method", which involved the application of two different kinds of medicine to either half of the body. Siemens retired in 1964 and was succeeded by his formal pupil, M. K. Polano, who had been head of the Dermatology Department at the Municipal Hospital in The Hague.

Leipzig University chose Siemens for the position of Chairman of Dermatology on the basis of his scientific contributions. Siemens was not a member of the NSDAP and his research was not well-liked by the Nazi Party. Siemens' research into hereditary diseases at this time gained criticism within the Nazis for not exploring far enough into the racial aspects of genetics. As a result, the Commission on Higher Education forced the appointment of a different researcher who belonged to the NSDAP, Brodo Spiethoff, and the position was taken away from Siemens.

=== Diseases named after Siemens ===
- Christ-Siemens-Touraine syndrome (Hypohidrotic ectodermal dysplasia)
- Hallopeau-Siemens syndrome (Recessive dystrophic epidermolysis bullosa)
- Ichthyosis bullosa of Siemens
- Bloch-Siemens syndrome (Incontinentia pigmenti)

== "Zwillingspathologie" (Twin Pathology) ==
The difference between identical twins and fraternal twins is the basis of the classical Twin Method, and first appeared in Siemens' work "Zwillingspathologie", or "Twin Pathology", in 1924.

While the twin method is generally attributed to Francis Galton's 1875 article "The History of Twins, as a Criterion of The Relative Powers of Nature and Nurture", Galton did not suggest the comparison between identical (monozygotic) and fraternal (dizygotic) twins; instead, Galton suggested using twins to test the power of the environment to change the similarity level between identical twins. Galton's article considered environmental factors such as social conditions and education; here, Galton faced objection that these environmental conditions were only a small part of the circumstances that could affect similarity of twins.

Curtis Merriman, an assistant professor of Education at the University of Wisconsin, also published a report called "Psychological Monographs" on the twin method describing the difference between the identical and fraternal twins in 1924; however, Merriman did not suggest that the difference between identical and fraternal twins could be used to explore hereditary traits and only interpreted his results as evidence for two types of twins.

Siemens' work introduced the classical "Twin Method", which is recognized as highly influential by current Twin Studies experts in genetics. Hermann Werner Siemens was the first researcher to attempt to determine the roles of genetics and environment in the specific case of naevi, which are moles or birthmarks. While Siemens focused on dermatological phenotypes, he also explored psychological features using twin studies. An example of this research was on the academic performance of identical and fraternal twins: His research found that identical twins were more likely to have a similar performance in school than fraternal twins.

Siemens wrote in "Zwillingspathologie" about his findings:

"If an illness is regularly dominant, then both of the identical twins either suffer from it or are free from it.. the nonidentical twins correlate as the siblings of a two-child family .... With the help of twin pathology, we found a possible way to judge hereditary influence on the investigated features .... The assessment is based on the comparison of the findings in identical and nonidentical twins."

His research included reporting on similarities in skin traits in monozygotic twins, including naevi among other dermatological traits. Within Siemens' research, he reported monozygotic twins having a higher concordance in naevus counts compared with siblings. Siemens' research into twin studies was well before the structure of DNA was discovered, and as a result, his work was highly useful in compiling a detailed compilation of dermatological phenotypes for both monozygotic and dizygotic twins.

Siemens commented about his work in the 1920s, "twins of one egg origin will be of immense value for geneticists and psychologists."

=== Reception in Europe ===
Not all researchers in the 1920s fully accepted Siemens' work initially. Siemens' research was criticized for proposing that identical twins had to have almost total concordance of a dermatological trait in order for the trait to be hereditary. Siemens argued that his work could be used to assess hereditary influence on features that were only partially determined by genetics rather than environment.

== Racial hygiene and Nazi affiliation ==
Siemens was a major figure in the German racial hygiene movement by the early 1920s; Siemens later supported the Nazis and their racial policies. In 1916, Siemens published a book called Grundzuge Der Vererbungslehre, Rassenhygiene and Bevolkerungspolitik, or "Foundations of Genetics, Racial Hygiene and Population Policy". His work had a subsequent 12 editions, and the 8th edition included commentary on Hitler's political policies on racial hygiene. After World War II ended, his works were edited to remove his endorsement of Hitler, but not of his advocation of racial hygiene. As a result of Siemens' support for Hitler, some contemporary geneticists have omitted Siemens from the history of twin studies research as a form of revision by omission.

Siemens wrote in 1937,

"Since the National Socialist seizure of power the political goals that we, the racial hygienists, are in favor of, have now become a part—and not the least important one—of the German government program. 'Racial hygiene as a utopian dream' became 'Racial hygiene as political program'. . . . Our future will be governed by racial hygiene—or it will not exist at all."

With regard to the works of Francis Galton, Siemens commented in 1937,

"Galton already saw the possibility of integrating racial-hygienic ideals—just like a new religion—into the national conscious. The national [völkische] state, however, is now called on to be really serious about it. According to its Führer, it is the obligation of the national state 'to declare children as a people's most precious commodity' so that 'it will one day be considered reprehensible to withhold healthy children from the nation [emphasis in original].'"
