= Education =

Transmission of knowledge and skills

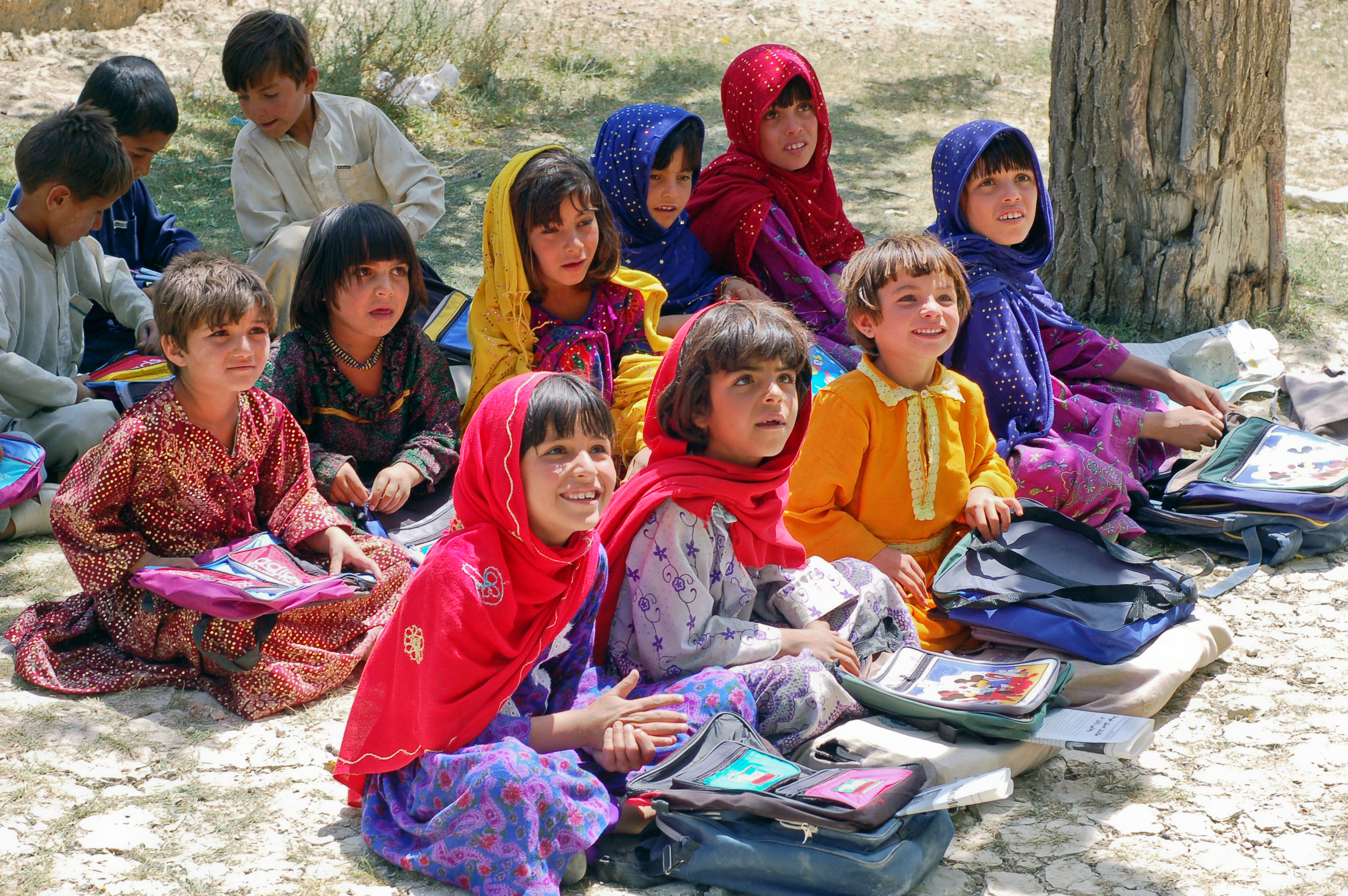
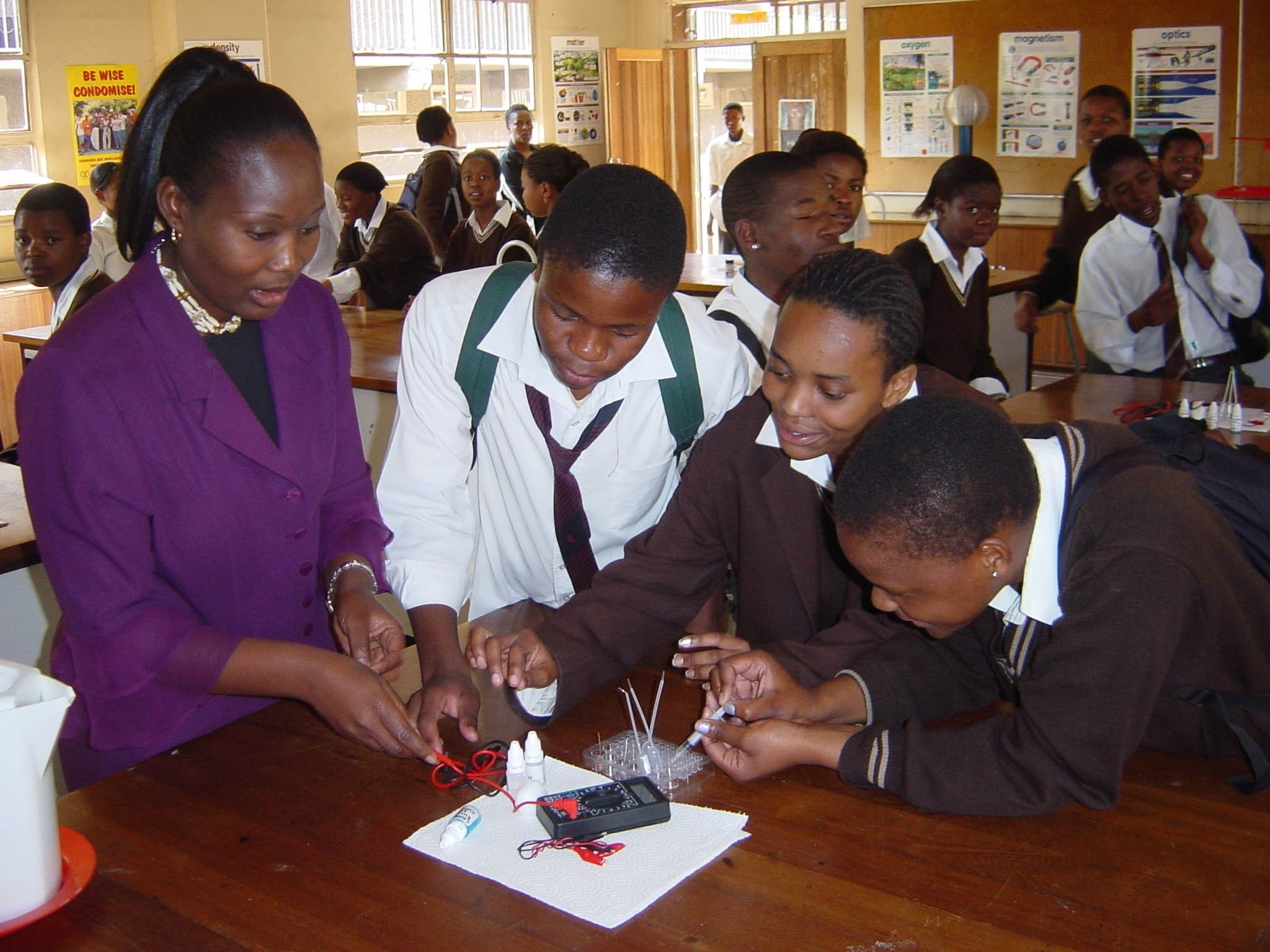
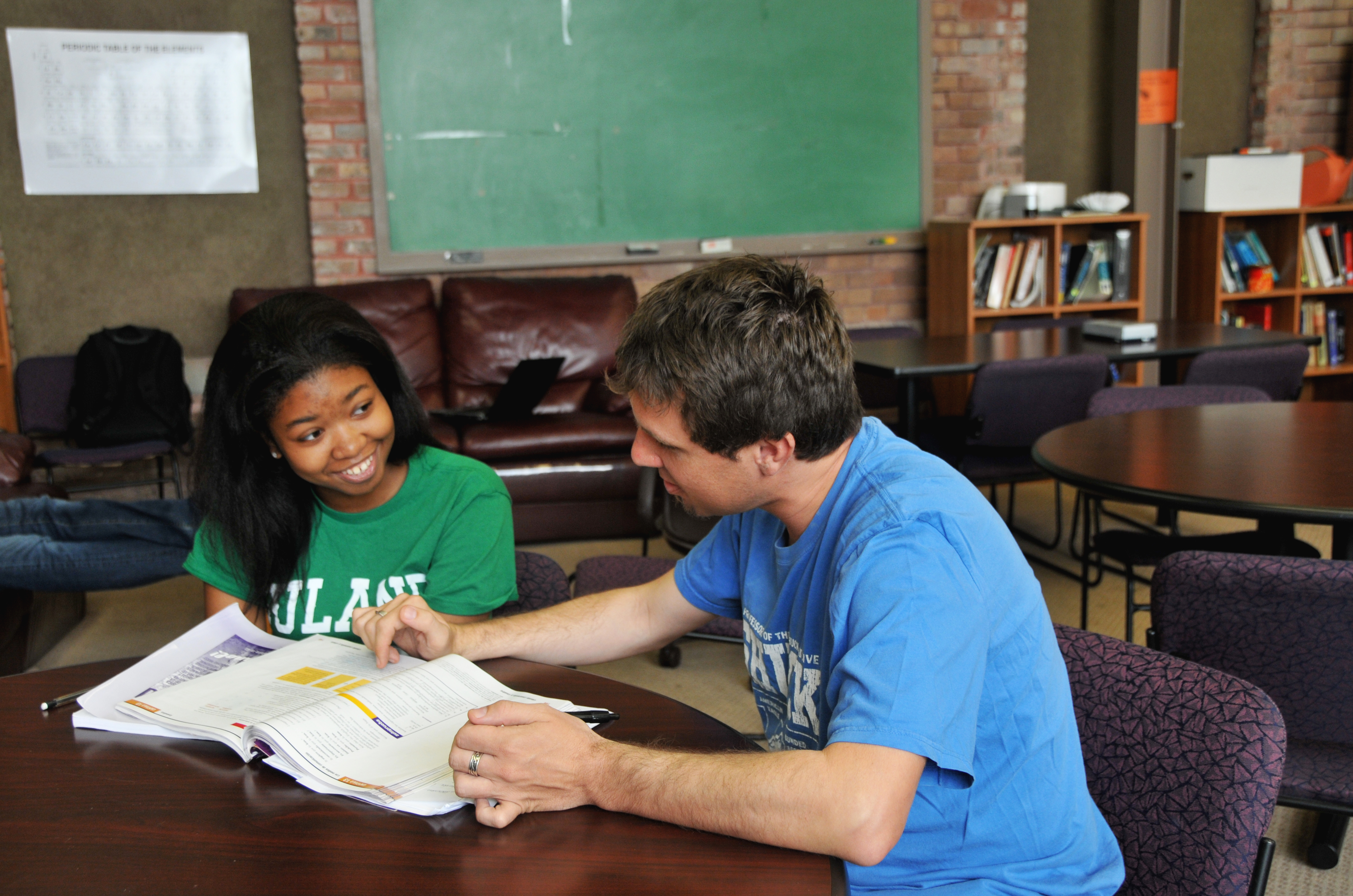
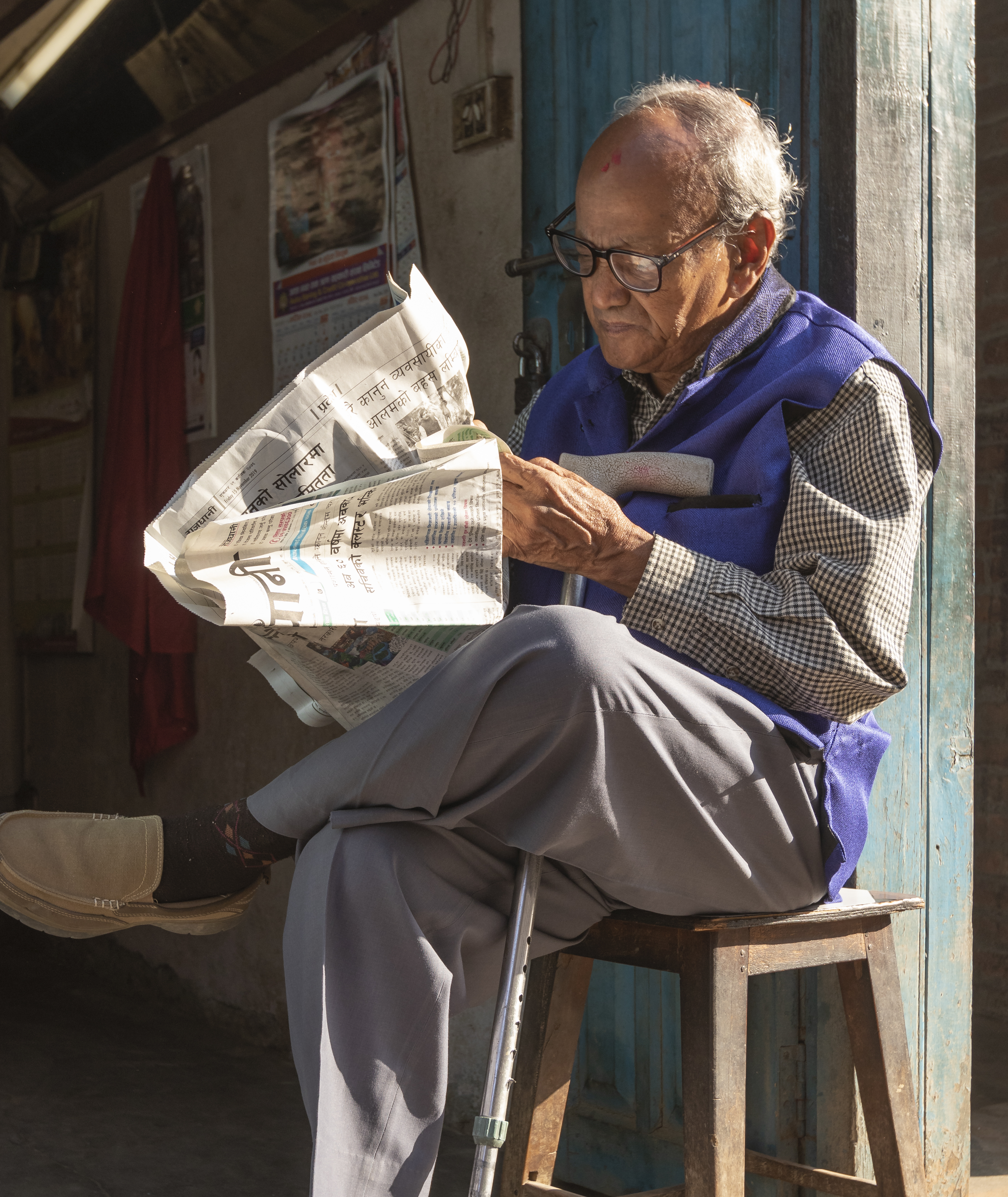
Education is a wide phenomenon that applies to all age groups and covers formal education (top row) as well as non-formal and informal education (bottom row).

Education is the transmission of knowledge and skills and the development of character traits. Formal education happens in a complex institutional framework, like public schools. Non-formal education is also structured but occurs outside the formal schooling system, while informal education is unstructured learning through daily experiences. Formal and non-formal education are divided into levels that include early childhood education, primary education, secondary education, and tertiary education. Other classifications focus on the teaching method, like teacher-centered and student-centered education, and on the subject, like science education, language education, and physical education. The term "education" can also refer to the mental states and qualities of educated people and the academic field studying educational phenomena.

The precise definition of education is disputed, and there are disagreements about what the aims of education are and to what extent education is different from indoctrination by fostering critical thinking. These disagreements affect how to identify, measure, and improve forms of education. Fundamentally, education socializes children into society by teaching cultural values and norms. It equips them with the skills needed to become productive members of society. This way, it stimulates economic growth and raises awareness of local and global problems. Organized institutions affect many aspects of education. For example, governments set education policies to determine when school classes happen, what is taught, and who can or must attend. International organizations, like UNESCO, have been influential in promoting primary education for all children.

Many factors influence whether education is successful. Psychological factors include motivation, intelligence, and personality. Social factors, like socioeconomic status, ethnicity, and gender, are often linked to discrimination. Further factors include access to educational technology, teacher quality, and parent involvement.

The main academic field investigating education is called education studies. It examines what education is, what aims and effects it has, and how to improve it. Education studies has many subfields, like philosophy, psychology, sociology, anthropology, and economics of education. It also discusses comparative education, pedagogy, and the history of education.

In prehistory, education happened informally through oral communication and imitation. With the rise of ancient civilizations, writing was invented, and the amount of knowledge grew. This caused a shift from informal to formal education. Initially, formal education was mainly available to elites and religious groups. The invention of the printing press in the 15th century made books more widely available. This increased general literacy. Beginning in the 18th and 19th centuries, public education became more important. This development led to the worldwide process of making primary education available to all, free of charge, and compulsory up to a certain age. Today, over 90% of all primary-school-age children worldwide attend primary school.

== Definitions ==
The term "education" is derived from the Latin words educare, meaning "to bring up" and educere, meaning "to bring forth". The definition of education has been explored by theorists from various fields. Many agree that education is a purposeful activity aimed at achieving goals like the transmission of knowledge, skills, and character traits. Extensive debate surrounds its exact nature beyond these general features. One approach views education as a process that occurs during events such as schooling, teaching, and learning. Another outlook understands education not as a process but as the mental states and dispositions of educated persons that result from this process. Additionally, the term may also refer to the academic field that studies the methods, processes, and social institutions involved in teaching and learning. Having a clear idea of what the term means matters when trying to identify educational phenomena, measure educational success, and improve educational practices.

Some theorists provide precise definitions by identifying the specific features that are exclusive to all forms of education. Education theorist R. S. Peters, for instance, outlines three essential features of education, which include that knowledge and understanding are imparted to the student and that this process is beneficial and done in a morally appropriate manner. Such precise definitions often succeed at characterizing the most typical forms of education. However, they often face criticism because less common types of education occasionally fall outside their parameters. The difficulty of dealing with counterexamples not covered by precise definitions can be avoided by offering less exact definitions based on family resemblance instead. This means that all forms of education are similar to one another, but they need not share a set of essential features. Some education theorists, such as Keira Sewell and Stephen Newman, hold that the term "education" is context-dependent. (Note: This implies that its meaning varies depending on the situation in which it is used.)

Evaluative or thick conceptions (Note: A thick concept is a concept that includes both descriptive and evaluative content.) of education state that it is part of the nature of education to lead to some kind of improvement. They contrast with thin conceptions, which provide a value-neutral explanation. Some theorists provide a descriptive conception of education by observing how the term is commonly used in ordinary language. Prescriptive conceptions, by contrast, define what good education is or how education should be practiced. Many thick and prescriptive conceptions see education as an activity that tries to achieve certain aims, which may range from acquiring knowledge and learning to think rationally to nurturing character traits like kindness and honesty.

Various scholars stress the role of critical thinking to distinguish education from indoctrination. They state that mere indoctrination is only interested in instilling beliefs in the student, independent of whether the beliefs are rational; whereas education also fosters the rational ability to critically reflect on and question those beliefs. It is not universally accepted that these two phenomena can be clearly distinguished since some forms of indoctrination may be necessary in the early stages of education while the child's mind is not yet sufficiently developed. This applies to cases in which young children need to learn something without being able to understand the underlying reasons, like certain safety rules and hygiene practices.

Education can be characterized from the teacher's or the student's perspective. Teacher-centered definitions focus on the perspective and role of the teacher in the transmission of knowledge and skills in a morally appropriate way. Student-centered definitions analyze education from the student's involvement in the learning process and hold that this process transforms and enriches their subsequent experiences. Definitions taking both perspectives into account are also possible. This can take the form of describing education as a process of a shared experience of discovering a common world and solving problems.

== Types ==
There are many classifications of education. One of them depends on the institutional framework and distinguishes between formal, non-formal, and informal education. Another classification includes distinct levels of education based on factors like the student's age and the complexity of the content. Further categories focus on the topic, teaching method, medium used, and funding.

=== Formal, non-formal, and informal ===
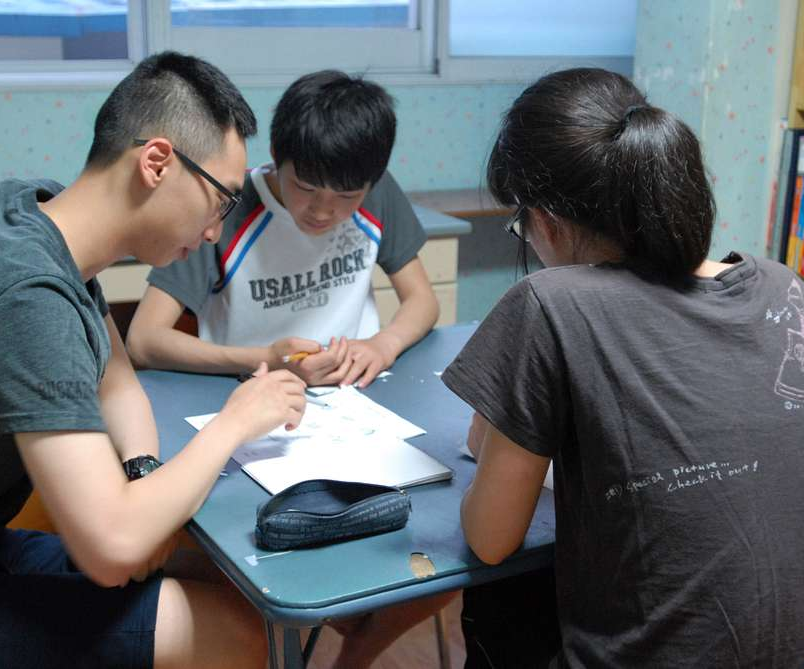
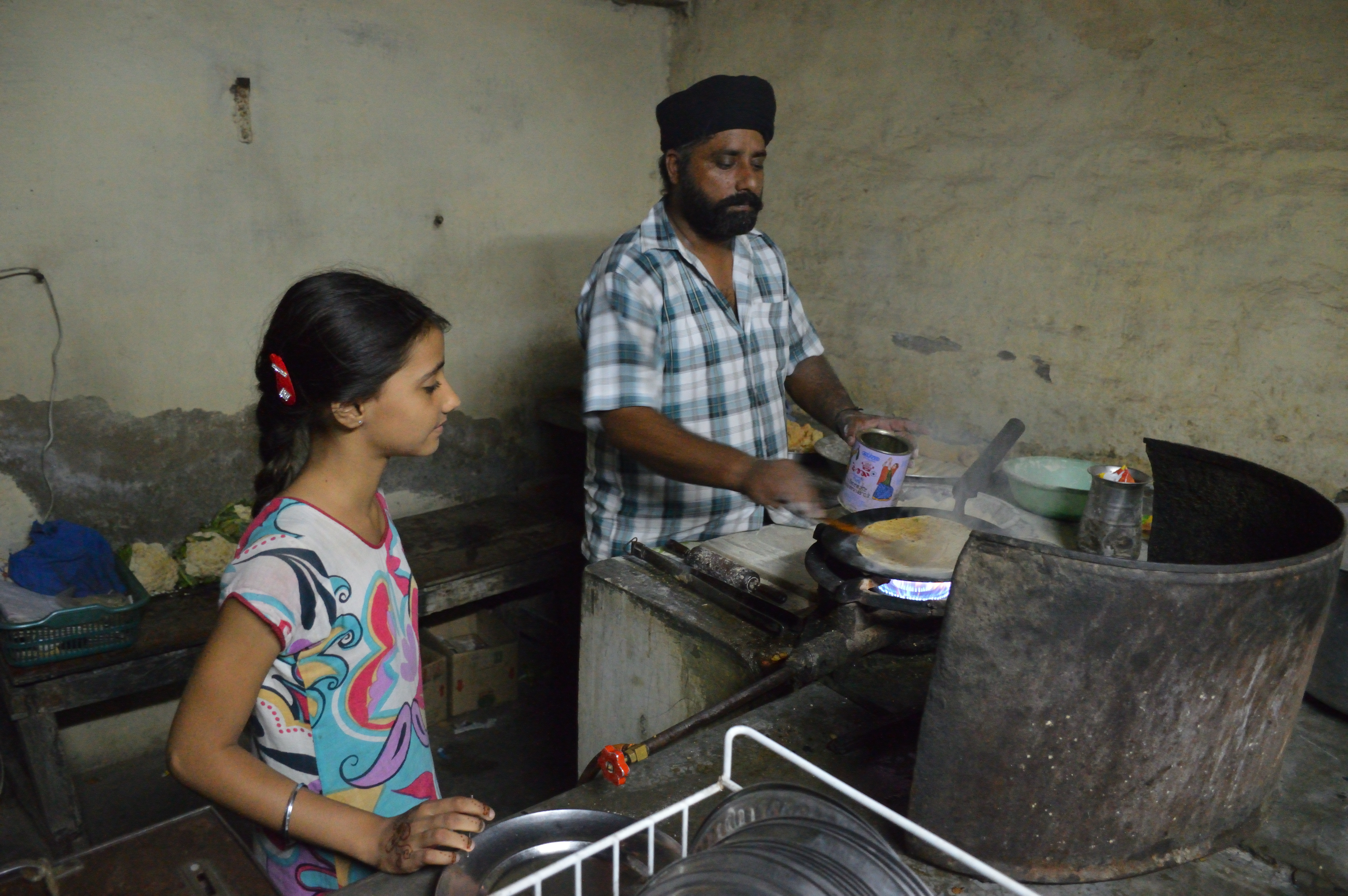
Tutoring is an example of non-formal education, while learning to cook from one's parents is an example of informal education.

The most common division is between formal, non-formal, and informal education. (Note: Some theorists only distinguish between formal and informal education.) Formal education happens in a complex institutional framework. Such frameworks have a chronological and hierarchical order: the modern schooling system has classes based on the student's age and progress, extending from primary school to university. Formal education is usually controlled and guided by the government. It tends to be compulsory up to a certain age.

Non-formal and informal education take place outside the formal schooling system. Non-formal education is a middle ground. Like formal education, it is organized, systematic, and carried out with a clear purpose, as in the case of tutoring, fitness classes, and the scouting movement. Informal education happens in an unsystematic way through daily experiences and exposure to the environment. Unlike formal and non-formal education, there is usually no designated authority figure responsible for teaching. Informal education takes place in many different settings and situations throughout one's life, usually in a spontaneous way. This is how children learn their first language from their parents and how people learn to prepare a dish by cooking together.

Some theorists distinguish the three types based on the location of learning: formal education takes place in school, non-formal education happens in places that are not regularly visited, like museums, and informal education occurs in places of everyday routines. There are also differences in the source of motivation. Formal education tends to be driven by extrinsic motivation for external rewards. In non-formal and informal education, enjoyment of the learning process usually provides intrinsic motivation. The distinction between the three types is normally clear, but some forms of education do not easily fall into one category.

In primitive cultures, most education occurred informally, and there was little distinction between educational activities and other activities. Instead, the whole environment acted as a form of school, and most adults acted as teachers. Informal education is often not efficient enough to teach large quantities of knowledge. To do so, a formal setting and well-trained teachers are usually required. This was one of the reasons why formal education became increasingly important throughout history. In this process, the experience of education and the discussed topics became more abstract and removed from daily life while more emphasis was put on grasping general patterns and concepts instead of observing and imitating particular forms of behavior.

=== Levels ===
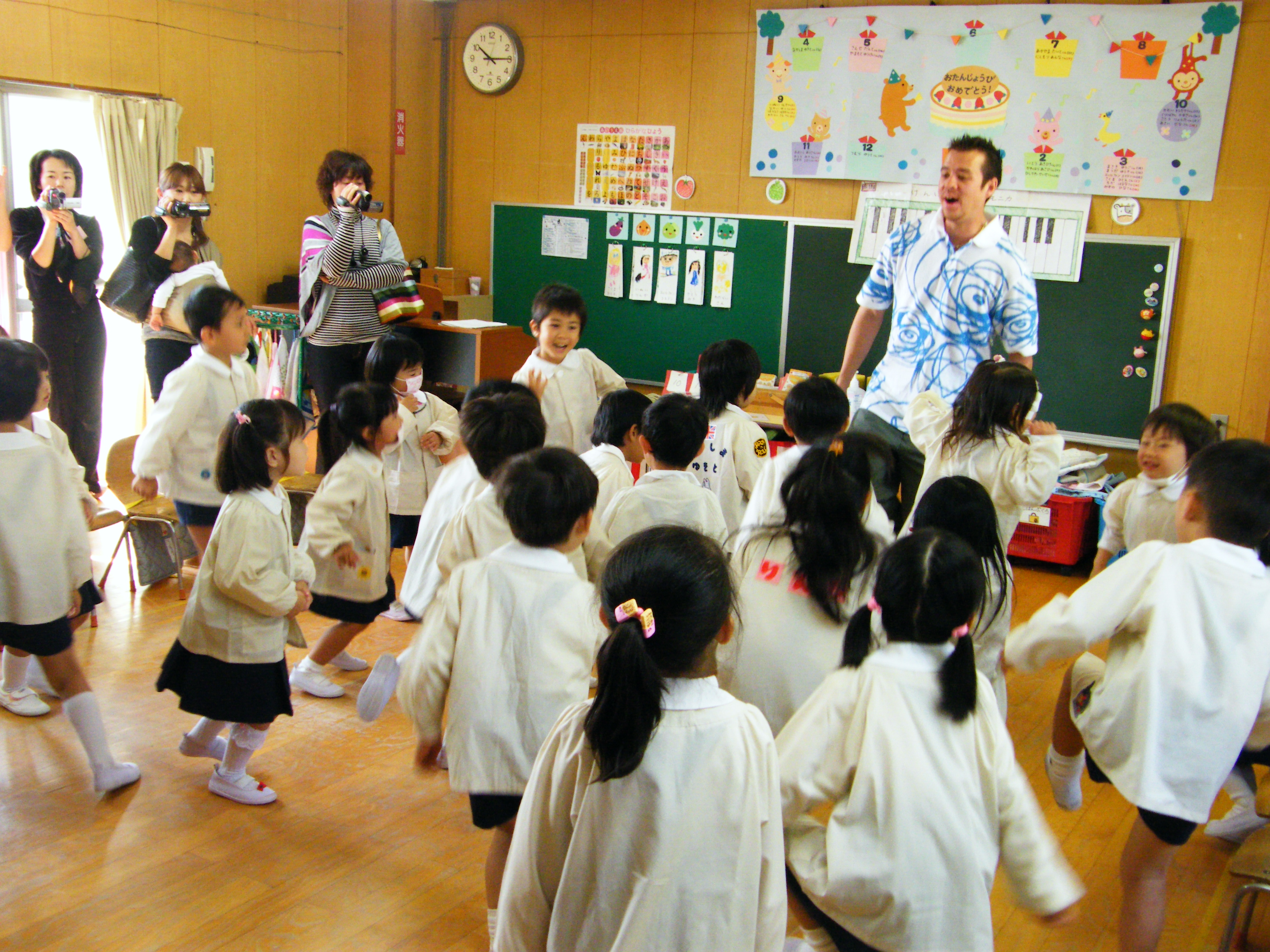
Young children in a kindergarten in Japan

Types of education are often divided into levels or stages. The most influential framework is the International Standard Classification of Education, maintained by the United Nations Educational, Scientific and Cultural Organization (UNESCO). It covers both formal and non-formal education and distinguishes levels based on the student's age, the duration of learning, and the complexity of the discussed content. Further criteria include entry requirements, teacher qualifications, and the intended outcome of successful completion. The levels are grouped into early childhood education (level 0), primary education (level 1), secondary education (levels 2–3), post-secondary non-tertiary education (level 4), and tertiary education (levels 5–8).

Early childhood education, also known as preschool education or nursery education, begins with birth and lasts until the start of primary school. It follows the holistic aim of fostering early childhood development across the physical, mental, and social domains. It plays a key role in socialization and personality development and includes various basic skills in the areas of communication, learning, and problem-solving. This way, it aims to prepare children for their entry into primary education. Preschool education is usually optional, but in some countries, such as Brazil, it is mandatory starting from the age of four.

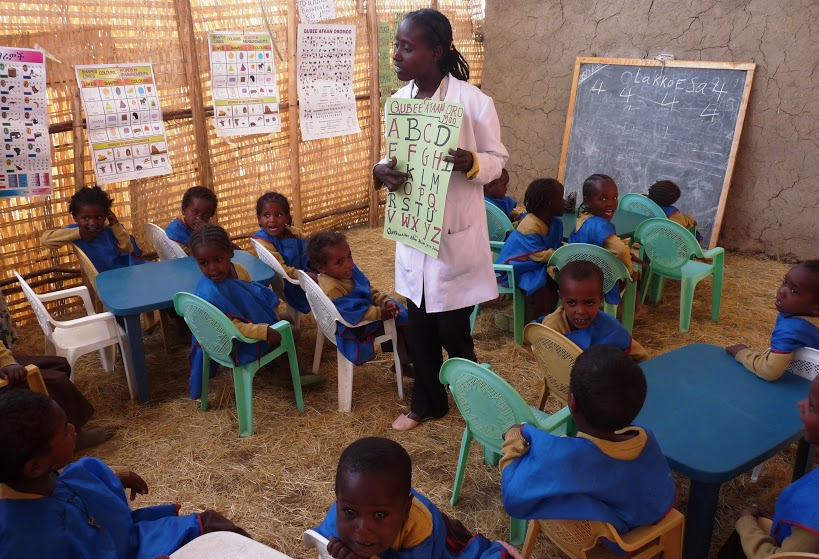
Primary school classroom in Ethiopia

Primary (or elementary) education usually starts between the ages of five and seven and lasts for four to seven years. It has no further entry requirements, and its main goal is to teach basic skills in reading, writing, and mathematics. It also covers core knowledge in other fields, such as history, geography, the sciences, music, and art. A further aim is to foster personal development. Today, primary education is compulsory in almost all countries, and over 90% of all primary-school-age children worldwide attend primary school.

Secondary education follows primary education and usually covers the ages of 12 to 18 years. It is commonly divided into lower secondary education (middle school or junior high school) and upper secondary education (high school, senior high school, or college depending on the country). Lower secondary education normally has the completion of primary school as its entry requirement. It aims to extend and deepen learning outcomes, is more focused on subject-specific curricula, and has teachers who specialize in only one or a few subjects. One of its aims is to familiarize students with the basic theoretical concepts in the different subjects. This helps create a solid basis for lifelong learning. In some cases, it also includes basic forms of vocational training. Lower secondary education is compulsory in many countries in Central and East Asia, Europe, and America. In some countries, it is the last stage of compulsory education. Mandatory lower secondary education is not as prevalent in Arab states, sub-Saharan Africa, and South and West Asia.

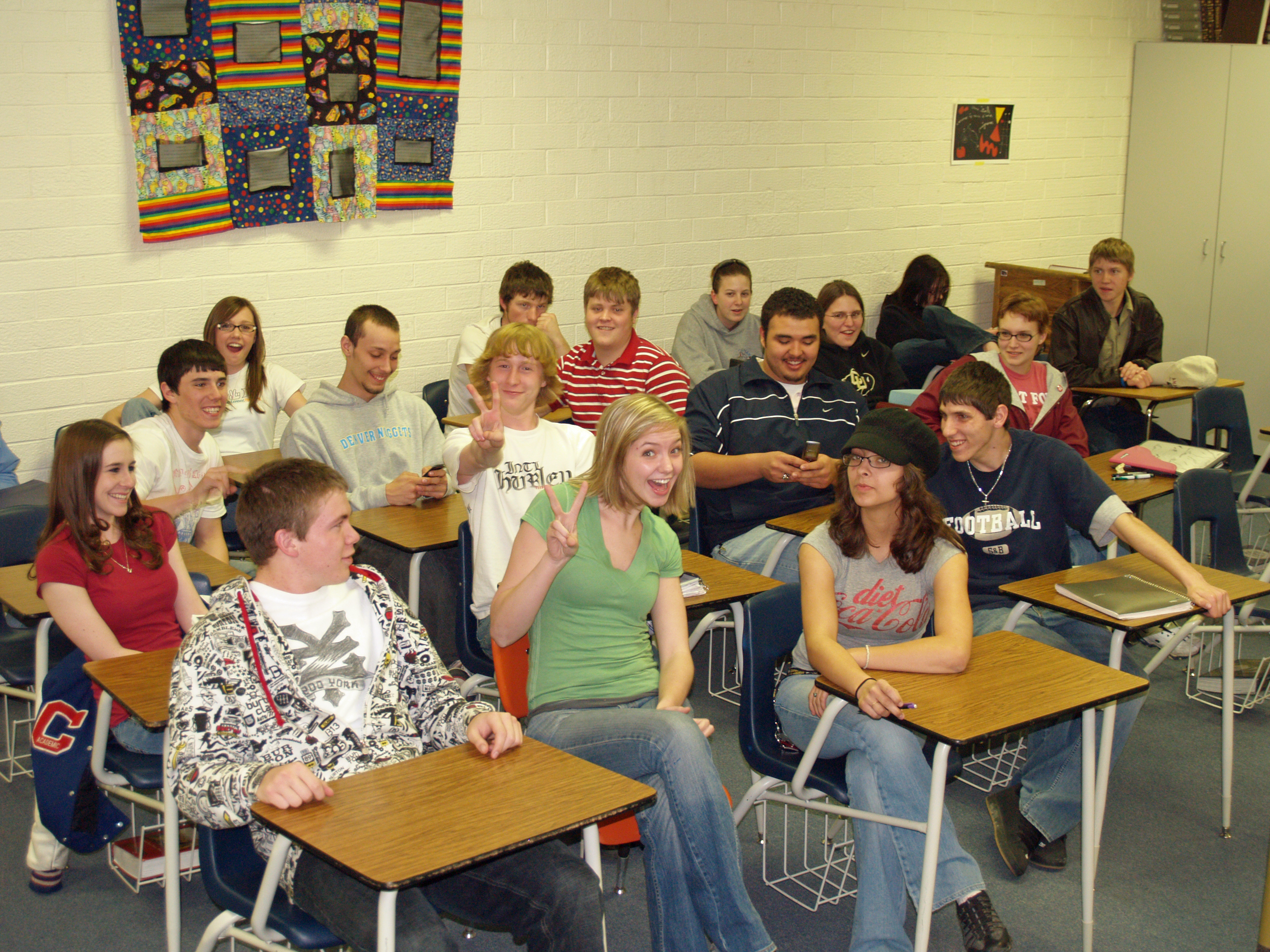
A high-school senior (twelfth grade) classroom in the United States

Upper secondary education starts roughly at the age of 15 and aims to provide students with the skills and knowledge needed for employment or tertiary education. Its requirement is usually the completion of lower secondary education. Its subjects are more varied and complex and students can often choose between a few subjects. Its successful completion is commonly tied to a formal qualification in the form of a high school diploma. Some types of education after secondary education do not belong to tertiary education and are categorized as post-secondary non-tertiary education. They are similar in complexity to secondary education but tend to focus more on vocational training to prepare students for the job market.

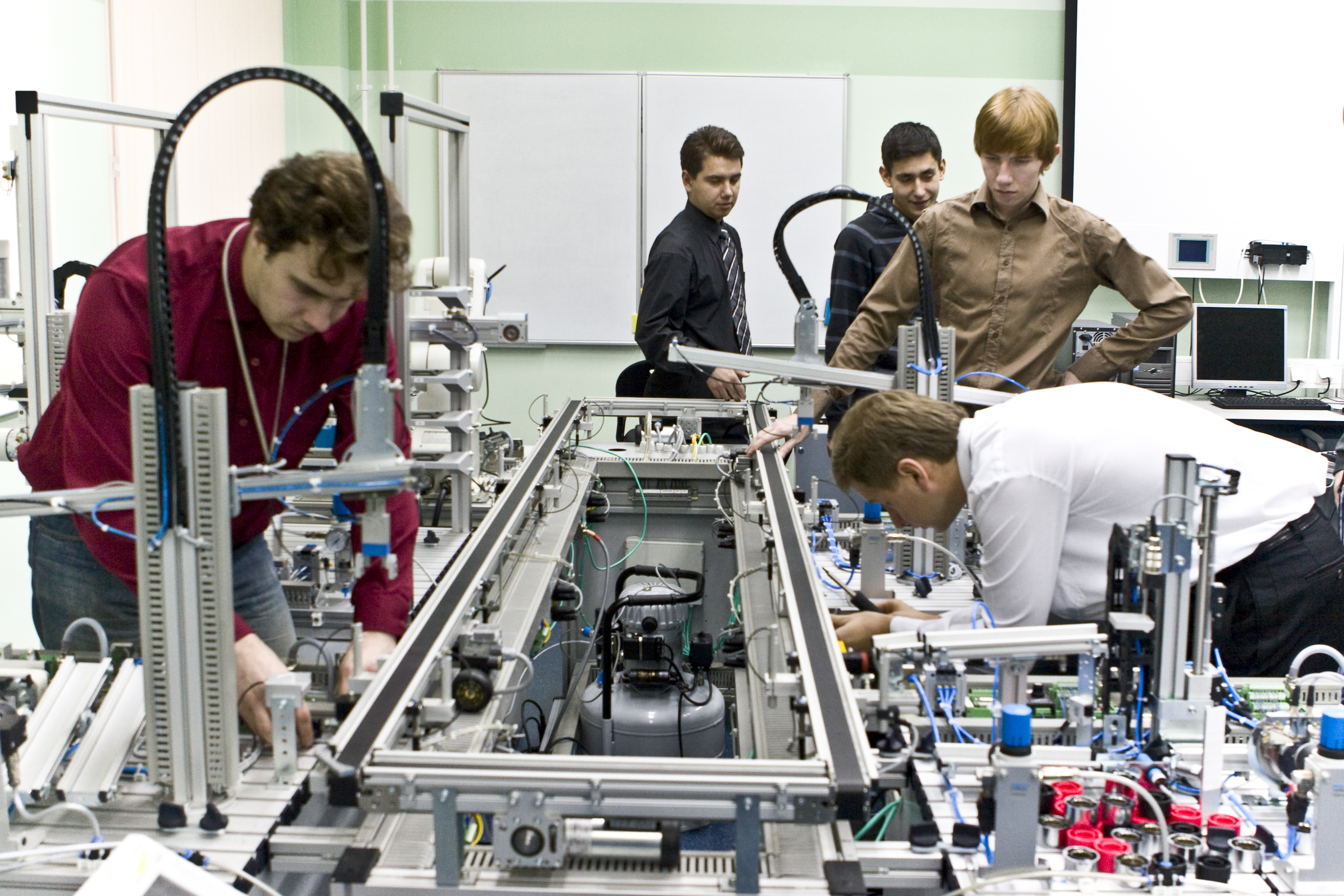
Students in a laboratory in the Saint Petersburg State Polytechnical University in Russia

In some countries, tertiary education is used as a synonym of higher education, while in others, tertiary education is the wider term. Tertiary education expands upon the foundations of secondary education but has a more narrow and in-depth focus on a specific field or subject. Its completion leads to an academic degree. It can be divided into four levels: short-cycle tertiary, bachelor's, master's, and doctoral level education. These levels often form a hierarchical structure with later levels depending on the completion of previous levels. Short-cycle tertiary education focuses on practical matters. It includes advanced vocational and professional training to prepare students for the job market in specialized professions. Bachelor's level education, also referred to as undergraduate education, tends to be longer than short-cycle tertiary education. Universities usually offer it as an intermediate academic certification, namely a bachelor's degree. Master's level education is more specialized than undergraduate education. Many programs require independent research in the form of a master's thesis for successful completion. Doctoral level education leads to an advanced research qualification, normally in the form of a doctor's degree, such as a Doctor of Philosophy (PhD). It usually requires the submission of a substantial academic work, such as a dissertation. More advanced levels include post-doctoral studies and habilitation.

Successful participation in formal education usually results in a form of certification that is required for higher levels of education and certain professions. Undetected cheating in exams, for example, by using a cheat sheet, threatens to undermine this system if unqualified students are certified.

In most countries, primary and secondary education are free of charge. There are significant global differences in the cost of tertiary education. A few countries, like Sweden, Finland, Poland, and Mexico, offer tertiary education for free or at a low cost. In some countries, like the United States and Singapore, tertiary school tuition fees are high and students often have to take substantial loans to afford their studies. High costs of education can constitute a significant barrier to students in developing countries whose families may be unable to afford school fees, uniforms, and textbooks.

=== Others ===
The academic literature discusses many other types of education and distinguishes between traditional and alternative education. Traditional education concerns long-established and mainstream schooling practices. It uses teacher-centered education and takes place in a well-regulated school environment. Regulations cover many aspects of education, such as the curriculum and the timeframe when classes start and end.

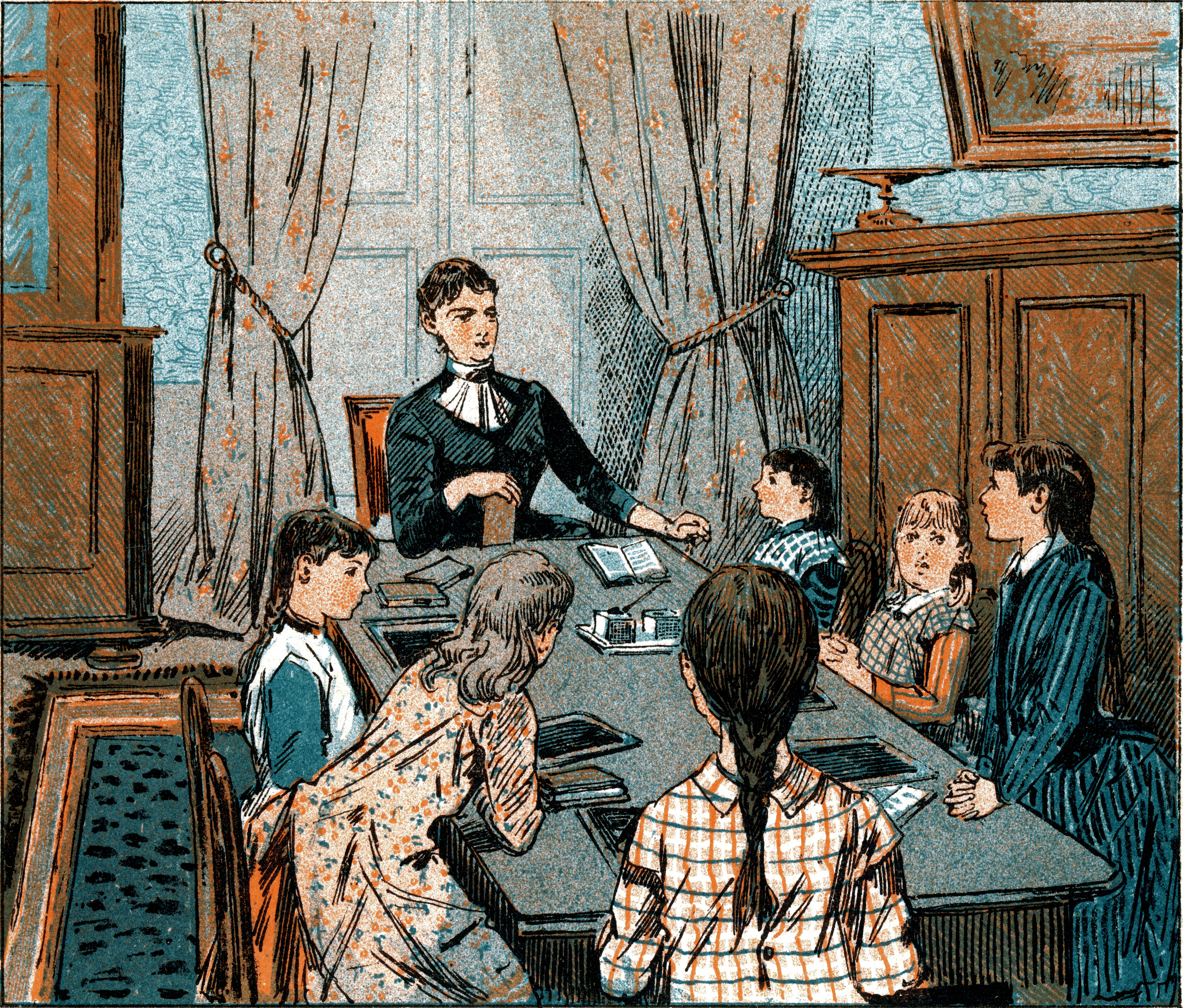
Homeschooling is one form of alternative education.

Alternative education is an umbrella term for forms of schooling that differ from the mainstream traditional approach. Differences may include learning environment, subjects, or the teacher-student relationship. Alternative schooling is characterized by voluntary participation, relatively small class and school sizes, and personalized instruction. This often results in a more welcoming and emotionally safe atmosphere. Alternative education encompasses many types like charter schools and special programs for problematic or gifted children. It also includes homeschooling and unschooling. There are many alternative schooling traditions, like Montessori schools, Waldorf schools, Round Square schools, Escuela Nueva schools, free schools, and democratic schools. Alternative education also includes indigenous education, which focuses on the transmission of knowledge and skills from an indigenous heritage and employs methods like narration and storytelling. Further types of alternative schools include gurukul schools in India, madrasa schools in the Middle East, and yeshivas in Jewish tradition.

Some distinctions focus on who receives education. Categories by the age of the learner are childhood education, adolescent education, adult education, and elderly education. Categories by biological sex of the students include single-sex education and mixed-sex education. Special education is education that is specifically adapted to meet the unique needs of students with disabilities. It covers various forms of impairments on the intellectual, social, communicative, and physical levels. It aims to overcome the challenges posed by these impairments. This way, it provides the affected students with access to an appropriate educational structure. When understood in the broadest sense, special education also includes education for very gifted children who need adjusted curricula to reach their fullest potential.

Classifications based on the teaching method include teacher-centered education, in which the teacher takes center stage in providing students with information, and student-centered education, in which students take on a more active and responsible role in shaping classroom activities. For conscious education, learning and teaching happen with a clear purpose in mind. Unconscious education occurs on its own without being consciously planned or guided. This may happen in part through the personality of teachers and adults, which can have indirect effects on the development of the student's personality. Evidence-based education uses scientific studies to determine which methods of education work best. Its goal is to maximize the effectiveness of educational practices and policies by ensuring that they are informed by the best available empirical evidence. It includes evidence-based teaching, evidence-based learning, and school effectiveness research.

Autodidacticism, or self-education, happens without the guidance of teachers and institutions. It mainly occurs in adult education and is characterized by the freedom to choose what to study and when, which can make it a more fulfilling learning experience. The lack of structure and guidance can result in aimless learning, and the absence of external feedback may lead autodidacts to develop false ideas and inaccurately assess their learning progress. Autodidacticism is closely related to lifelong education, which is an ongoing learning process throughout a person's entire life.

Categories of education based on the subject include science education, language education, art education, religious education, physical education, and sex education. Special mediums, such as radio or websites, are used in distance education. Examples include e-learning (use of computers), m-learning (use of mobile devices), and online education. They often take the form of open education, in which courses and materials are made available with minimal barriers to access. They contrast with regular classroom or on-site education. Some forms of online education are not open education, such as full online degree programs offered by some universities.

State education, also referred to as public education, (Note: In some regions, these two terms have different meanings. In the United Kingdom, for example, public schools are run by private institution and charge fees, while state schools are controlled by the government and provide free education.) is funded and controlled by the government and available to the general public. It normally does not require tuition fees and is thus a form of free education. Private education, by contrast, is funded and managed by private institutions. Private schools often have a more selective admission process and offer paid education by charging tuition fees. A more detailed classification focuses on the social institution responsible for education, like family, school, civil society, state, and church.

Compulsory education is education that people are legally required to receive. It concerns mainly children who need to visit school up to a certain age. It contrasts with voluntary education, which people pursue by personal choice without a legal requirement.

== Role in society ==
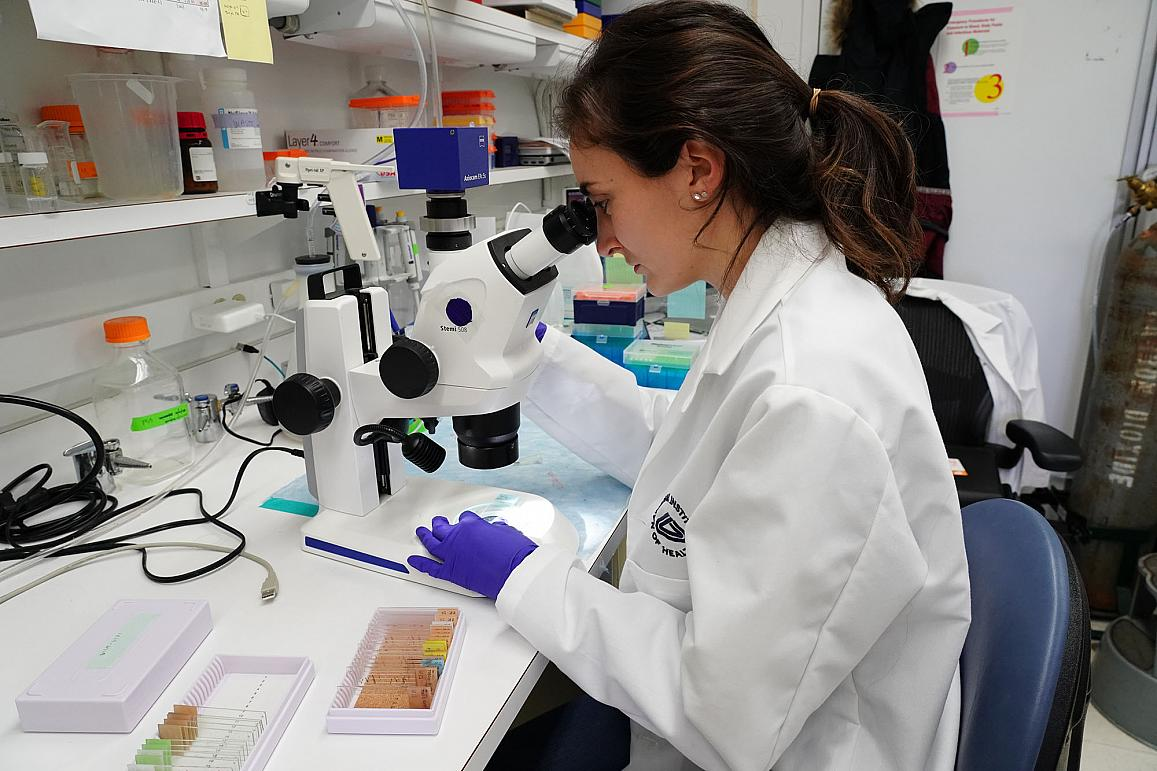
Highly specialized professionals, like medical researchers, often require extensive education to master their fields and contribute to society.

Education plays various roles in society, including in social, economic, and personal fields. On a social level, education makes it possible to establish and sustain a stable society or can act as a driver of societal transformation. It helps people acquire the basic skills needed to interact with their environment and fulfill their needs and desires. In modern society, this involves a wide range of skills like being able to speak, read, write, solve arithmetic problems, and handle information and communications technology. Socialization also includes learning the dominant social and cultural norms and what kinds of behavior are considered appropriate in different contexts. Education enables the social cohesion, stability, and peace needed for people to productively engage in daily business. Socialization happens throughout life but is of special relevance to early childhood education. Education plays a key role in democracies by increasing civic participation in the form of voting and organizing, and through its tendency to promote equal opportunity for all.

On an economic level, people become productive members of society through education by acquiring the technical and analytical skills needed to pursue their profession, produce goods, and provide services to others. In early societies, there was little specialization, and each child would generally learn most of the skills that the community required to function. Modern societies are increasingly complex and many professions are only mastered by relatively few people who receive specialized training in addition to general education. Some of the skills and tendencies learned to function in society may conflict with each other, and their value depends on the context of their usage. For example, cultivating the tendency to be inquisitive and question established teachings promotes critical thinking and innovation, but in some cases, obedience to an authority is required to ensure social stability.

Income and wealth, by educational level (US)

Median annual salaries across educational levels varied by a factor of about 3.

Median accumulated household wealth across educational levels varied by a factor of over 50.

By helping people become productive members of society, education stimulates economic growth and reduces poverty. It helps workers become more skilled and thereby increases the quality of the produced goods and services, which in turn leads to prosperity and increased competitiveness. Public education is often understood as a long-term investment to benefit society as a whole. The rate of return is especially high for investments in primary education. Besides increasing economic prosperity, it can also lead to technological and scientific advances as well as decrease unemployment while promoting social equity. Increased education is associated with lower birth rates, in part because education augments the awareness of family planning, creates new opportunities for women, and tends to raise the age of marriage. However, the rate of return of education can vary due to overqualification.

Education can prepare a country to adapt to changes and successfully face new challenges. It can help raise awareness and contribute to the solution of contemporary global problems, such as climate change, sustainability, and the widening inequalities between the rich and the poor. By making students aware of how their lives and actions affect others, it may inspire some to work toward realizing a more sustainable and fair world. This way, education serves not just the purpose of maintaining the societal status quo, but can also be an instrument of social development. That applies also to changing circumstances in the economic sector. For example, technological advances, particularly increased automation, are accompanied by new demands on the workforce, which education can help address. Changing circumstances may render currently taught skills and knowledge redundant while shifting the importance to other areas. Education can be used to prepare people for such changes by adjusting the curriculum, introducing subjects like digital literacy, promoting skills in handling new technologies, and including new forms of education such as massive open online courses.

On a more individual level, education promotes personal development. This can include factors such as learning new skills, developing talents, fostering creativity, and increasing self-knowledge as well as improving problem-solving and decision-making abilities. Education also has positive effects on health and well-being. Key factors responsible for these effects are that educated individuals tend to be better informed about health issues and adjust their behavior accordingly, have a better social support network and coping strategies, and have a higher income, which allows them access to high-quality healthcare services. The social importance of education is recognized by the annual International Day of Education on January 24. The United Nations declared the year 1970 the International Education Year.

== Role of institutions ==
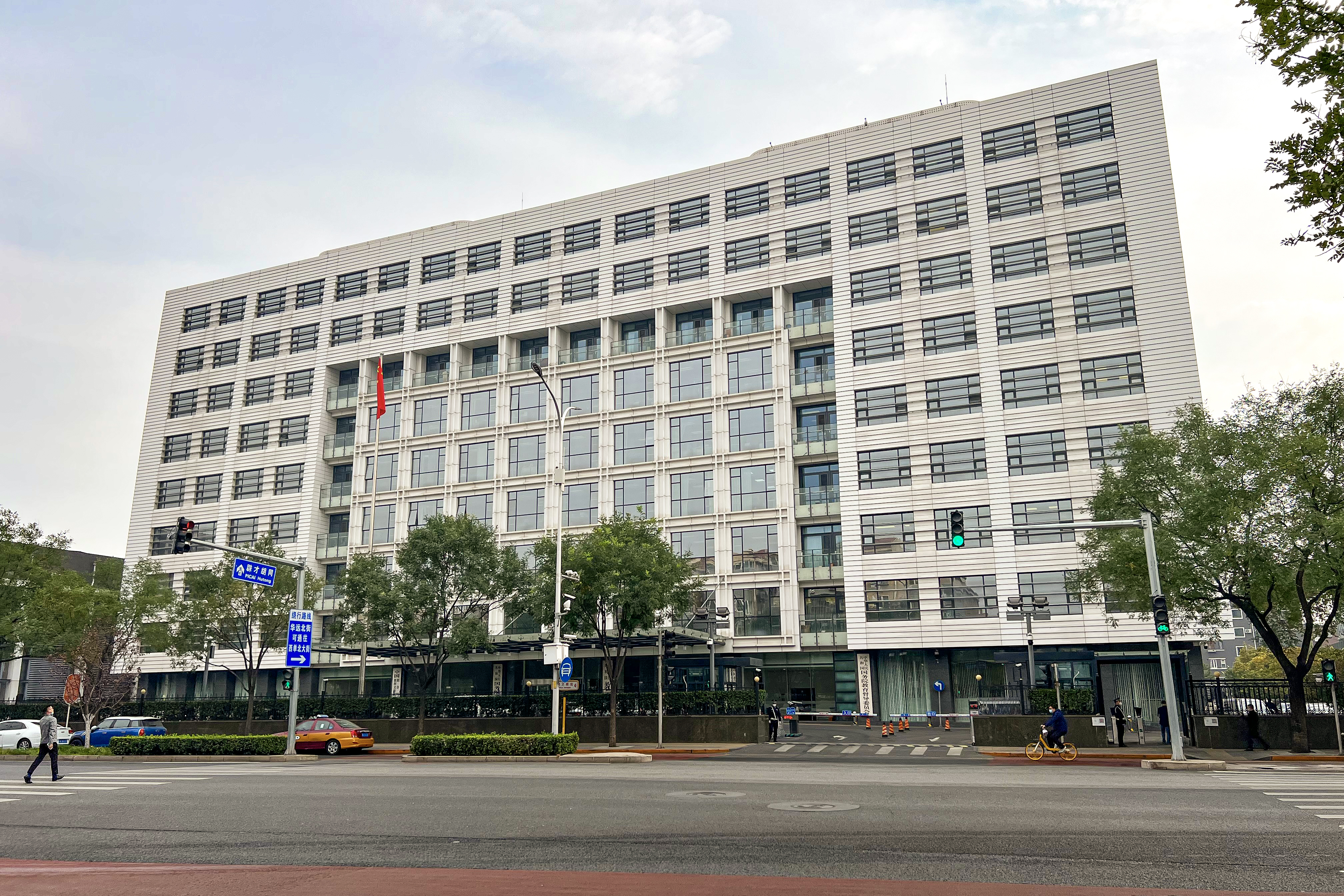
Governmental institutions, like the Chinese Ministry of Education, affect many aspects of public education.

Organized institutions play a key role in various aspects of education. Institutions like schools, universities, teacher training institutions, and ministries of education make up the education sector. They interact both with each other and with other stakeholders, such as parents, local communities, religious groups, non-governmental organizations, professionals in healthcare, law enforcement, media platforms, and political leaders. Many people are directly involved in the education sector, like students, teachers, and school principals as well as school nurses and curriculum developers.

Various aspects of formal education are regulated by the policies of governmental institutions. These policies determine at what age children need to attend school and at what times classes are held as well as issues pertaining to the school environment, like infrastructure. Regulations also cover the exact qualifications and requirements that teachers need to fulfill. An important aspect of education policy concerns the curriculum used for teaching at schools, colleges, and universities. A curriculum is a plan of instruction or a program of learning that guides students to achieve their educational goals. The topics are usually selected based on their importance and depend on the type of school. The goals of public school curricula are usually to offer a comprehensive and well-rounded education, while vocational training focuses more on specific practical skills within a field. The curricula also cover various aspects besides the topic to be discussed, such as the teaching method, the objectives to be reached, and the standards for assessing progress. By determining the curricula, governmental institutions have a strong impact on what knowledge and skills are transmitted to the students. Examples of governmental institutions include the Ministry of Education in India, the Department of Basic Education in South Africa, and the Secretariat of Public Education in Mexico.

International organizations, such as UNESCO, have wielded significant influence in shaping educational standards and policies worldwide.

International organizations also play a key role in education. For instance, UNESCO is an intergovernmental organization that promotes education in many ways. One of its activities is to advocate education policies, like the treaty Convention on the Rights of the Child, which states that education is a human right of all children and young people. The Education for All initiative aimed to offer basic education to all children, adolescents, and adults by the year 2015 and was later replaced by the initiative Sustainable Development Goals as goal 4. Related policies include the Convention against Discrimination in Education and the Futures of Education initiative.

Some influential organizations are not intergovernmental, but non-governmental. For example, the International Association of Universities promotes collaboration and the exchange of knowledge between colleges and universities around the world, while the International Baccalaureate offers international diploma programs. Institutions like the Erasmus Programme facilitate student exchanges between countries, while initiatives such as the Fulbright Program provide a similar service for teachers.

== Factors of educational success ==
Educational success, also called student and academic achievement, refers to the extent to which educational aims are reached, for example, the amount of knowledge and abilities that students acquire. For practical purposes, it is often measured primarily in terms of official exam scores, but there are many additional indicators, such as attendance rates, graduation rates, dropout rates, student attitudes, and post-school indicators like later job performance, personal income, and incarceration rates. Several factors influence educational achievement, including psychological factors, which concern the student as an individual, and sociological factors, which pertain to the student's social environment. Further factors are access to educational technology, teacher quality, and parent involvement. Many of these factors overlap and influence each other.

=== Psychological ===
On a psychological level, relevant factors include motivation, intelligence, and personality. Motivation is the internal force propelling people to engage in learning. Motivated students are more likely to interact with the content to be learned by participating in classroom activities like discussions, which often results in a deeper understanding of the subject. Motivation can also help students overcome difficulties and setbacks. An important distinction is between intrinsic and extrinsic motivation. Intrinsically motivated students are driven by an interest in the subject and the learning experience itself. Extrinsically motivated students seek external rewards like good grades and recognition from peers. Intrinsic motivation tends to be more beneficial by leading to increased creativity and engagement as well as long-term commitment. Educational psychologists try to discover how to increase motivation. This can be achieved, for instance, by encouraging some competition among students while ensuring a balance of positive and negative feedback in the form of praise and criticism.

Intelligence influences how people respond to education. It is a mental quality linked to the ability to learn from experience, to understand, and to employ knowledge and skills to solve problems. Those who have higher scores in intelligence metrics tend to perform better at school and go on to higher levels of education. Intelligence is often primarily associated with the so-called IQ, a standardized numerical metric for assessing intelligence by focusing on mathematical-logical and verbal skills. However, it has been argued that there are more types of intelligence. According to the psychologist Howard Gardner, there are distinct forms of intelligence belonging to fields like mathematics, logic, spatial cognition, language, and music. Further types affect how a person interacts with other people and with themselves. These types of intelligence are largely independent of each other, meaning that someone may excel at one type while scoring low on another.

According to proponents of learning style theory, the preferred method of acquiring knowledge and skills is another factor. They hold that students with an auditory learning style find it easy to comprehend spoken lectures and discussions, whereas visual learners benefit from information presented visually, such as in diagrams and videos. To facilitate efficient learning, it may be advantageous to incorporate a wide variety of learning modalities. Learning styles have been criticized for ambiguous empirical evidence of student benefits and unreliability of student learning style assessment by teachers. The learner's personality may also influence educational achievement. For instance, characteristics such as conscientiousness and openness to experience, identified in the Big Five personality traits, are associated with academic success. Other mental factors include self-efficacy, self-esteem, and metacognitive abilities.

=== Sociological ===
Sociological factors focus not on psychological attributes of learners but on their environment and position in society. They include socioeconomic status, ethnicity, cultural background, and gender. They are of interest to researchers since they are associated with inequality and discrimination. For this reason, they play a key role in policy-making in attempts to mitigate their effects.

Socioeconomic status depends on income but includes other factors, such as financial security, social status, social class, and quality of life attributes. Low socioeconomic status affects educational success in various ways. It is linked to slower cognitive developments in language and memory and higher dropout rates. Poor families may not have enough money to meet basic the nutritional needs of their children, causing poor development. They may also lack the means to invest in educational resources like stimulating toys, books, and computers. Additionally, they may be unable to afford tuition at prestigious schools and are more likely to attend schools in poorer areas. Such schools tend to offer lower standards of teaching because of teacher shortages or because they lack educational materials and facilities, like libraries. Poor parents may also be unable to afford private lessons if their children fall behind. In some cases, students from an economically disadvantaged background are forced to dropout from school to provide income to their families. They also have less access to information on higher education and may face additional difficulties in securing and repaying student loans. Low socioeconomic status also has many indirect negative effects by being linked to lower physical and mental health. Due to these factors, social inequalities on the level of the parents are often reproduced in the children.

Ethnic background is linked to cultural differences and language barriers, which make it more difficult for students to adapt to the school environment and follow classes. Additional factors are explicit and implicit biases and discrimination toward ethnic minorities. This may affect the students' self-esteem and motivation as well as their access to educational opportunities. For example, teachers may hold stereotypical views even if they are not overtly racist, which can lead them to grade comparable performances differently based on the child's ethnicity.

Historically, gender has been a central factor in education since the roles of men and women were defined differently in many societies. Education tended to strongly favor men, who were expected to provide for the family. Women, by contrast, were expected to manage the household and rear children, which barred most educational opportunities available to them. While these inequalities have improved in most modern societies, there are still gender differences in education. Among other things, this concerns biases and stereotypes linked to the role of gender in education. They affect subjects like science, technology, engineering, and mathematics, which are often presented as male fields. This discourages female students from following them. In various cases, discrimination based on gender and social factors happens openly as part of official educational policy, such as the severe restrictions on female education instituted by the Taliban in Afghanistan and the school segregation of migrants and locals in urban China under the hukou system.

One aspect of many social factors is given by the expectations associated with stereotypes. They work both on an external level, based on how other people react to a person belonging to a certain group, and on an internal level, based on how the person internalizes them and acts accordingly. In this sense, the expectations may turn into self-fulfilling prophecies by causing the educational outcomes they anticipate. This can happen both for positive and negative stereotypes.

=== Technology and others ===
Technology plays another significant role in educational success. Educational technology is commonly associated with the use of modern digital devices, like computers. But understood in the broadest sense, it involves a wide range of resources and tools for learning, including basic aids that do not involve the use of machines, like regular books and worksheets.

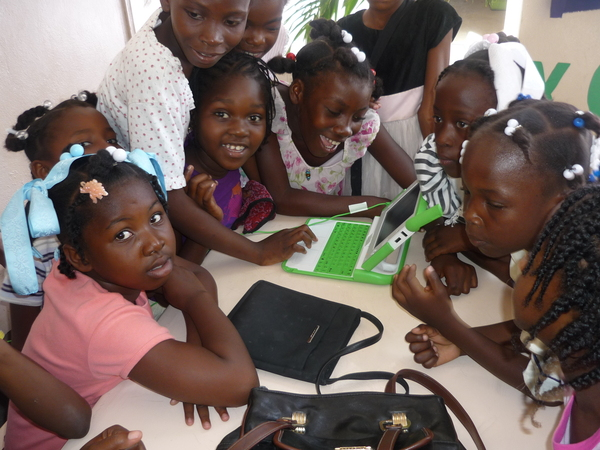
A One Laptop per Child device being introduced to children in Haiti

Educational technology can benefit learning in various ways. In the form of media, it often takes the role of the primary supplier of information in the classroom. This means that the teacher can focus their time and energy on other tasks, like planning the lesson and guiding students as well as assessing educational performance. Educational technology can also make information easier to understand by presenting it using graphics, audio, and video rather than through mere text. In this regard, interactive elements may be used to make the learning experience more engaging in the form of educational games. Technology can be employed to make educational materials accessible to many people, like when using online resources. It additionally facilitates collaboration between students and communication with teachers. The use of artificial intelligence in education holds various potentials, such as providing new learning experiences to students and assisting teachers in their work, but also poses new risks associated with data privacy, false information, and manipulation. Various organizations promote student access to educational technologies, such as the One Laptop per Child initiative, the African Library Project, and Pratham.

School infrastructure also influences educational success. It includes physical aspects of the school, like its location and size as well as the available school facilities and equipment. A healthy and safe environment, well-maintained classrooms, and suitable classroom furniture as well as the availability of a library and a canteen tend to contribute to educational success. The quality of the teacher also has an important impact on student achievement. Skilled teachers know how to motivate and inspire students and are able to adjust their instructions to the students' abilities and needs. Important in this regard are the teacher's own education and training as well as their past teaching experience. A meta-analysis by Engin Karadağ et al. concludes that, compared to other influences, factors related to the school and the teacher have the biggest impact on educational success.

Parent involvement also boosts achievement and can make children more motivated and invested if they are aware that their parents care about their educational efforts. This tends to lead to increased self-esteem, better attendance rates, and more constructive behavior at school. Parent involvement also includes communication with teachers and other school staff to make other parties aware of current issues and how they may be resolved. Further relevant factors sometimes discussed in the academic literature include historical, political, demographic, religious, and legal aspects.

== Education studies ==
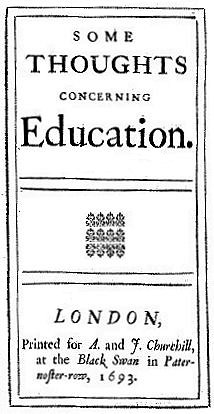
John Locke's book Some Thoughts Concerning Education from 1693 is one of the foundational works of education studies.

The main discipline investigating education is called education studies, also referred to as education sciences. It tries to determine how people transmit and acquire knowledge by studying the methods and forms of education. It is interested in its aims, effects, and value as well as the cultural, societal, governmental, and historical contexts that shape education. Education theorists integrate insights from many other fields of inquiry, including philosophy, psychology, sociology, economics, history, politics, and international relations. Because of these influences, some theorists claim that education studies is not an independent academic discipline like physics or history since its method and subject are not as clearly defined. Education studies differs from regular training programs, such as teacher training, since its focus on academic analysis and critical reflection goes beyond the skills needed to be a good teacher. It is not restricted to the topic of formal education but examines all forms and aspects of education.

Various research methods are used to study educational phenomena. They roughly divide into quantitative, qualitative, and mixed-methods approaches. Quantitative research emulates the methods found in the natural sciences by using precise numerical measurements to gather data from many observations and employs statistical tools to analyze it. It aims to arrive at an objective and impersonal understanding. Qualitative research usually has a much smaller sample size and tries to get an in-depth insight into more subjective and personal factors, like how different actors experience the process of education. Mixed-methods research aims to combine data gathered from both approaches to arrive at a balanced and comprehensive understanding. Data can be collected in various ways, like using direct observation or test scores as well as interviews and questionnaires. Some research projects study basic factors affecting all forms of education, while others concentrate on one specific application, look for solutions to concrete problems, or examine the effectiveness of educational projects and policies. A 2026 large-scale replication project in the social and behavioural sciences, which included educational research, found that roughly half of the tested claims replicated, indicating limited reproducibility.

=== Subfields ===
Education studies encompasses various subfields like pedagogy, comparative education, and the philosophy, psychology, sociology, economics, and history of education. The philosophy of education is the branch of applied philosophy that examines many of the basic assumptions underlying the theory and practice of education. It studies education both as a process and as a discipline while trying to provide exact definitions of its nature and how it differs from other phenomena. It further examines the purpose of education, its different types, and how to conceptualize teachers, students, and their relation. It includes educational ethics, which investigates the moral implications of education; for example, what ethical principles direct it and how teachers should apply them to specific cases. The philosophy of education has a long history and was discussed in ancient Greek philosophy.

The term "pedagogy" is sometimes used as a synonym for education studies, but when understood in a more restricted sense, it refers to the subfield interested in teaching methods. It studies how the aims of education, like the transmission of knowledge or fostering skills and character traits, can be realized. It is interested in the methods and practices used for teaching in regular schools. Some definitions restrict it to this domain, but in a wider sense, it covers all types of education, including forms of teaching outside schools. In this general sense, it explores how teachers can bring about experiences in learners to advance their understanding of the studied topic and how the learning itself takes place.

The psychology of education studies how education happens on the mental level, specifically how new knowledge and skills are acquired as well as how personal growth takes place. It examines what factors influence educational success, how they may differ between individuals, and to what extent nature or nurture is responsible. Influential psychological theories of education are behaviorism, cognitivism, and constructivism. Closely related fields are the neurology of education and educational neuroscience, which are interested in the neuropsychological processes and changes brought about through learning.

The sociology of education is concerned with how education leads to socialization. It examines how social factors and ideologies affect what kind of education is available to a person and how successful they are. Closely related questions include how education affects different groups in society and how educational experiences can form someone's personal identity. The sociology of education is specifically interested in the causes of inequalities, and its insights are relevant to education policy by trying to identify and mitigate factors that cause inequality. Two influential schools of thought are consensus theory and conflict theory. Consensus theorists hold that education benefits society as a whole by preparing people for their roles. Conflict theories have a more negative outlook on the resulting inequalities and see education as a force used by the ruling class to promote their own agenda.

The economics of education is the field of inquiry studying how education is produced, distributed, and consumed. It tries to determine how resources should be used to improve education, for example, by examining to what extent the quality of teachers is increased by raising their salary. Other questions are how smaller class sizes affect educational success and how to invest in new educational technologies. This way, the economics of education helps policy-makers decide how to distribute the limited resources most efficiently to benefit society as a whole. It also tries to understand what long-term role education plays for the economy of a country by providing a highly skilled labor force and increasing its competitiveness. A closely related issue concerns the economic advantages and disadvantages of different systems of education.

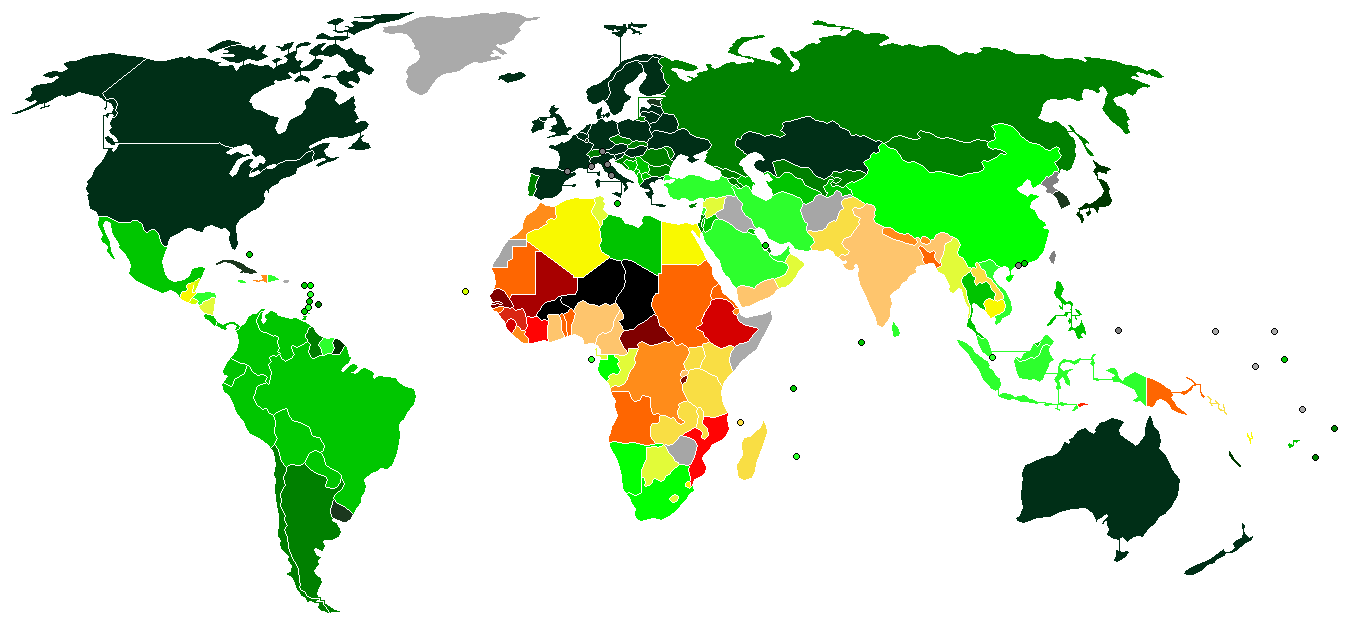
Comparative education uses tools like the Education Index to compare educational systems in different countries. Countries with a high score are shown in green, while red indicates a low score.

Comparative education is the discipline that examines and contrasts systems of education. Comparisons can happen from a general perspective or focus on specific factors, like social, political, or economic aspects. Comparative education is often applied to different countries to assess the similarities and differences of their educational institutions and practices as well as to evaluate the consequences of the distinct approaches. It can be used to learn from other countries which education policies work and how one's own system of education may be improved. This practice is known as policy borrowing and comes with many difficulties since the success of policies can depend to a large degree on the social and cultural context of students and teachers. A closely related and controversial topic concerns the question of whether the educational systems of developed countries are superior and should be exported to less developed countries. Other key topics are the internationalization of education and the role of education in transitioning from an authoritarian regime to a democracy.

The history of education examines the evolution of educational practices, systems, and institutions. It discusses various key processes, their possible causes and effects, and their relations to each other.

=== Aims and ideologies ===
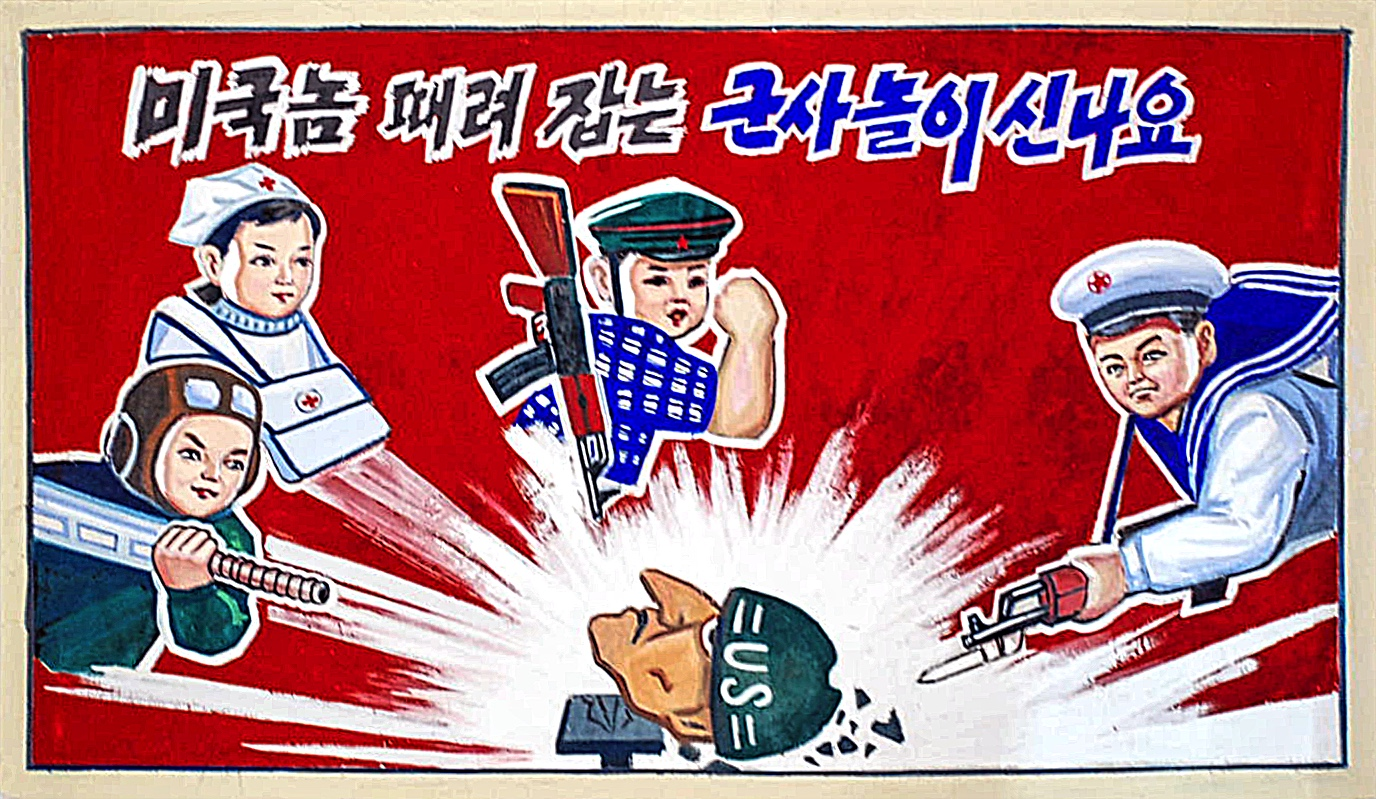
Propaganda poster in a primary school in North Korea. Authoritarian regimes often use education to indoctrinate students.

A central topic in education studies concerns the question of how people should be educated and what goals should guide this process. Many aims of education have been suggested, such as the acquisition of knowledge and skills as well as personal development and fostering of character traits. Common suggestions encompass features like curiosity, creativity, rationality, and critical thinking as well as the tendency to think, feel, and act morally. Some scholars focus on liberal values linked to freedom, autonomy, value pluralism and open-mindedness, while others prioritize qualities like obedience to authority, conformity, ideological purity, piety, and religious faith.

Some education theorists focus a single overarching purpose of education and see the more specific aims as means to this end. On a personal level, this purpose is often identified with helping the student lead a good life. On a societal level, education makes people productive members of society. It is controversial whether the primary aim of education is to benefit the educated person or society as a whole.

Educational ideologies are systems of basic philosophical assumptions and principles that can be used to interpret, understand, and evaluate existing educational practicies and policies. They cover various additional issues besides the aims of education, like what topics are learned and how the learning activity is structured. Other themes include the role of the teacher, how educational progress should be assessed, and how institutional frameworks and policies should be structured. There are many ideologies, and they often overlap in various ways. Teacher-centered ideologies place the main emphasis on the teacher's role in transmitting knowledge to students, while student-centered ideologies give a more active role to the students in the process. Process-based ideologies focus on what the processes of teaching and learning should be like and contrast with product-based ideologies, which discuss education from the perspective of the result to be achieved. Conservative ideologies rely on traditional and well-established practices while progressive ideologies emphasize innovation and creativity. Further categories are humanism, romanticism, essentialism, encyclopaedism, and pragmatism as well as authoritarian and democratic ideologies.

=== Learning theories ===
Learning theories try to explain how learning happens. Influential theories are behaviorism, cognitivism, and constructivism. Behaviorism understands learning as a change in behavior in response to environmental stimuli. This happens by presenting the learner with a stimulus, associating this stimulus with the desired response, and solidifying this stimulus-response pair. Cognitivism sees learning as a change in cognitive structures and focuses on the mental processes involved in storing, retrieving, and processing information. Constructivism holds that learning is based on the personal experience of each individual and puts more emphasis on social interactions and how they are interpreted by the learner. These theories have important implications for how to teach. For example, behaviorists tend to focus on drills, while cognitivists may advocate the use of mnemonics, and constructivists tend to employ collaborative learning strategies.

Various theories suggest that learning is more efficient when it is based on personal experience. An additional factor is to aim at a deeper understanding by connecting new to pre-existing knowledge rather than merely memorizing a list of unrelated facts. An influential developmental theory of learning is proposed by psychologist Jean Piaget, who outlines four stages of learning through which children pass on their way to adulthood: the sensorimotor, the pre-operational, the concrete operational, and the formal operational stage. They correspond to different levels of abstraction with early stages focusing more on simple sensory and motor activities, while later stages include more complex internal representations and information processing in the form of logical reasoning.

=== Teaching methods ===
The teaching method concerns the way the content is presented by the teacher, for example, whether group work is used instead of a focus on individual learning. There are many teaching methods available and which one is most efficient in a case depends on factors like the subject matter and the learner's age and competence level. This is reflected in the fact that modern school systems organize students by age, competence, specialization, and native language into different classes to ensure a productive learning process. Different subjects frequently use different approaches; for instance, language education often focuses on verbal learning, while mathematical education is about abstract and symbolic thinking together with deductive reasoning. One central requirement for teaching methodologies is to ensure that the learner remains motivated because of interest and curiosity or through external rewards.

Teaching method also encompasses the use of instructional media used, such as books, worksheets, and audio-visual recordings, and having some form of test or assessment to evaluate the learning progress. Educational assessment is the process of documenting the student's knowledge and skills, which can happen formally or informally and may take place before, during, or after the learning activity. An important pedagogical aspect in many forms of modern education is that each lesson is part of a larger educational enterprise governed by a syllabus, which often covers several months or years. According to Herbartianism, teaching is divided into phases. The initial phase consists of preparing the student's mind for new information. Next, new ideas are first presented to the learner and then associated with ideas with which the learner is already familiar. In later phases, the understanding shifts to a more general level behind the specific instances, and the ideas are then put into concrete practice.

== History ==
The history of education studies the processes, methods, and institutions involved in teaching and learning. It tries to explain how they have interacted with each other and shaped educational practice until the present day.

=== Prehistory ===
Education in prehistory took place as a form of enculturation and focused on practical knowledge and skills relevant to everyday concerns, for example, in relation to food, clothing, shelter, and protection. There were no formal schools or specialized teachers, and most adults in the community performed that role and learning happened informally during everyday activities, for example, when children observed and imitated their elders. For these oral societies, storytelling played a key role in transferring cultural and religious ideas from one generation to the next. (Note: Research on prehistoric education often relies on studies of surviving hunting and gathering societies.) Beginning with the emergence of agriculture around 9000 BCE, a slow educational change towards more specialization began to occur as people formed larger groups and more complex artisanal and technical skills were needed.

=== Ancient era ===
Starting in the 4th millennium BCE and continuing through the following millennia, a major shift in educational practices started to take place with the invention of writing in regions such as Mesopotamia, ancient Egypt, the Indus Valley, and ancient China. (Note: There is no consensus when exactly writing was invented and various forms of proto-writing have existed for much longer.) This development had a significant influence on the history of education as a whole. Through writing, it was possible to store, preserve, and communicate information. This facilitated various subsequent developments; for example, the creation of educational tools, like textbooks, and the formation of institutions, like schools.

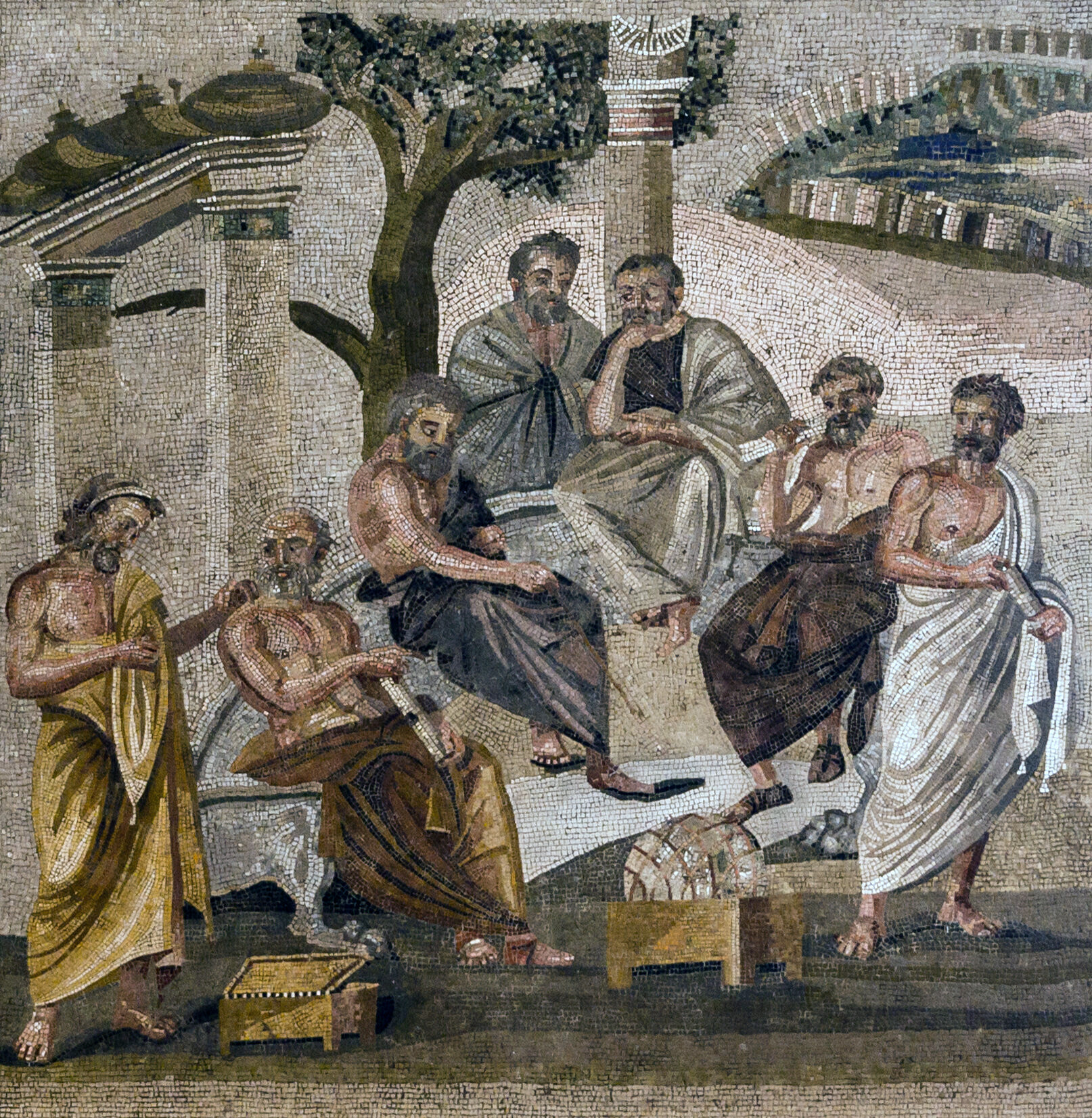
Plato's Academy is often seen as the first school of higher learning. (Mosaic from Pompeii).

Another key aspect of ancient education was the establishment of formal education. This became necessary since the amount of knowledge grew as civilizations evolved, and informal education proved insufficient to transmit all requisite knowledge between generations. Teachers would act as specialists to impart knowledge, and education became more abstract and further removed from daily life. Formal education was still quite rare in ancient societies and was restricted to the intellectual elites. It covered fields like reading and writing, record keeping, leadership, civic and political life, religion, and technical skills associated with specific professions. Formal education introduced a new way of teaching that gave more emphasis to discipline and drills than the earlier informal modes of education. Two often-discussed achievements of ancient education are the establishment of Plato's Academy in Ancient Greece, which is sometimes considered the first institute of higher learning, and the creation of the Great Library of Alexandria in Ancient Egypt as one of the most prestigious libraries of the ancient world.

=== Medieval era ===
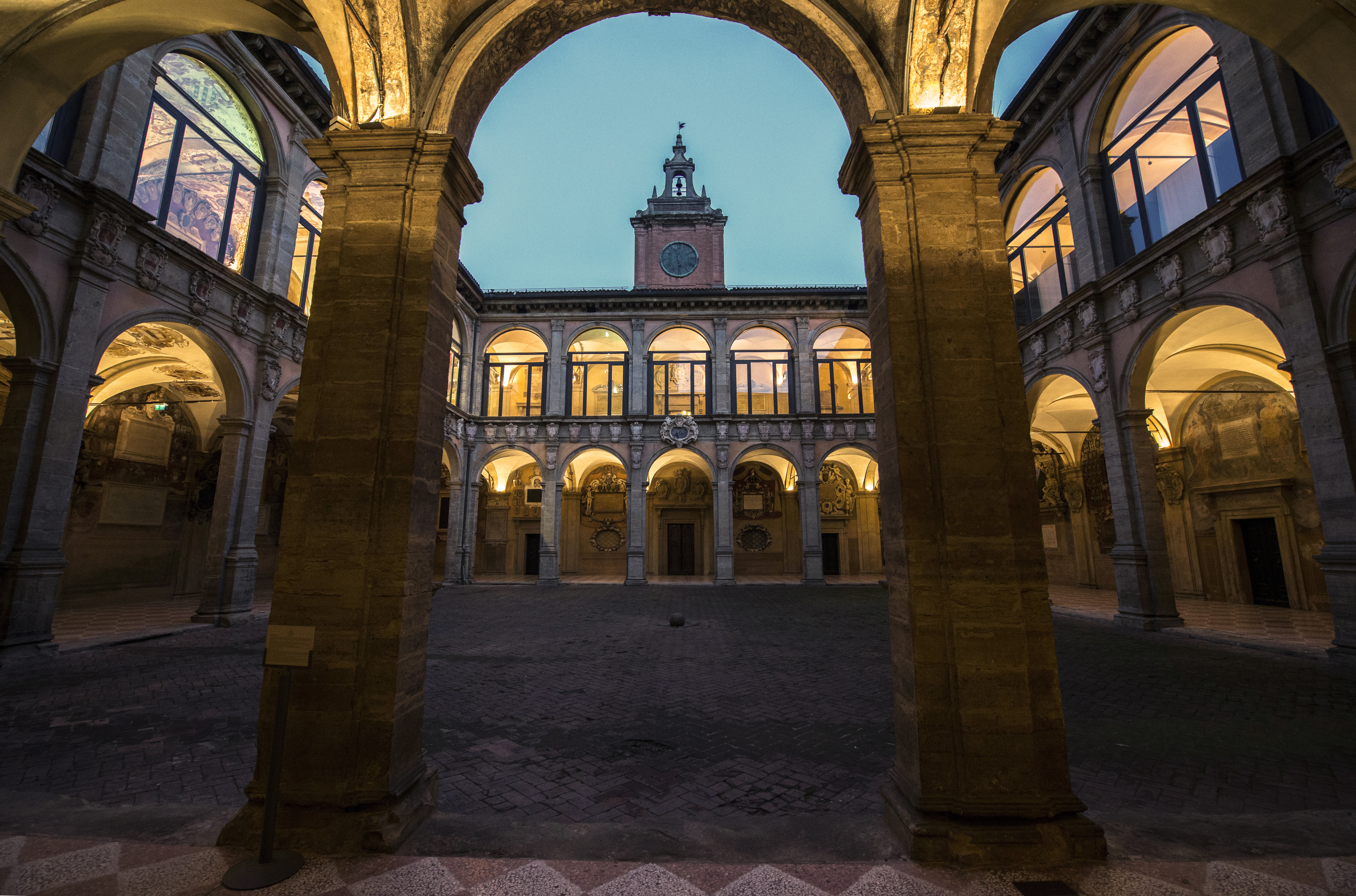
Bologna University in Italy, established in 1088 CE, is the world's oldest university in continuous operation.

Many aspects of education in the medieval period were shaped by religious traditions. In Europe, the Catholic Church wielded a significant influence over formal education. In the Arab world, the newly founded religion of Islam spread rapidly and led to various educational developments during the Islamic Golden Age, for example, by integrating classical and religious knowledge and by establishing madrasa schools. In Jewish communities, yeshivas were established as institutions dedicated to the study of religious texts and Jewish law. In China, an expansive state educational and exam system influenced by Confucian teachings was established. New complex societies began to evolve in other regions, such as Africa, the Americas, Northern Europe, and Japan. Some incorporated preexisting educational practices, while others developed new traditions.

Additionally, this period saw the establishment of various institutes of higher education and research. The first universities in Europe were the University of Bologna, the University of Paris, and Oxford University. Other influential centers of higher learning were the Al-Qarawiyyin University in Morocco, the Al-Azhar University in Egypt, and the House of Wisdom in Iraq. Another key development was the creation of guilds, which were associations of skilled craftsmen and merchants who controlled the practice of their trades. They were responsible for vocational education, and new members had to pass through different stages on their way to masterhood.

=== Modern era ===
The invention of the printing press made written media widely available and led to a significant increase in general literacy.

Starting in the early modern period, education in Europe during the Renaissance slowly began to shift from a religious approach towards one which was more secular. This development was tied to an increased appreciation of the importance of education and a broadened range of topics, including a revived interest in ancient literary texts and educational programs. The turn toward secularization was accelerated during the Age of Enlightenment starting in the 17th century, which emphasized the role of reason and the empirical sciences. European colonization affected education in the Americas through Christian missionary initiatives. In China, the state educational system was further expanded and focused more on the teachings of neo-Confucianism. In the Islamic world, the outreach of formal education increased and remained under the influence of religion. A key development in the early modern period was the invention and popularization of the printing press in the middle of the 15th century, which had a profound impact on general education. It significantly reduced the cost of producing books, which were hand-written before, and thereby augmented the dissemination of written documents, including new forms like newspapers and pamphlets. The increased availability of written media had a major influence on the general literacy of the population.

These changes prepared the rise of public education in the 18th and 19th centuries. This period saw the establishment of publicly funded schools with the aim of providing education for all. (Note: For example, the world's first ministry of education was founded in 1773.) This contrasts with earlier periods when formal education was primarily provided by private schools, religious institutions, and individual tutors. Aztec civilization was an exception in this regard since formal education was mandatory for the youth regardless of social class as early as the 14th century. Closely related changes were to make education compulsory and free of charge for all children up to a certain age.

=== Contemporary era ===
Initiatives to promote public education and universal access to education made significant progress in the 20th and the 21st centuries and were promoted by intergovernmental organizations like the UN. Examples include the Universal Declaration of Human Rights, the Convention on the Rights of the Child, the Education for All initiative, the Millennium Development Goals, and the Sustainable Development Goals. These efforts resulted in a steady rise of all forms of education but affected primary education in particular. In 1970, 28% of all primary-school-age children worldwide did not attend school; by 2015, this number dropped to 9%.

The establishment of public education was accompanied by the introduction of standardized curricula for public schools as well as standardized tests to assess the student's progress. Contemporary examples include the Test of English as a Foreign Language, which is a globally used test to assess English language proficiency of non-native English speakers, and the Programme for International Student Assessment, which evaluates education systems worldwide based on how 15-year-old students perform in the fields of reading, mathematics, and science. Similar changes also affected teachers by setting in place institutions and norms to guide and oversee teacher training, like certification requirements for teaching at public schools.

Emerging educational technologies have shaped contemporary education. The widespread availability of computers and the internet dramatically increased access to educational resources and made new types of education possible, such as online education. This was of particular relevance during the COVID-19 pandemic when schools globally closed for extended periods and many offered remote learning through video conferencing or pre-recorded video lessons to continue instruction. Contemporary education is also shaped by the increased globalization and internationalization of education.

== See also ==
- Board of education – Board of directors, board of trustees of a school, local school district, or equivalent
- Career and technical education – Educational programs combining academic and technical skills for workforce preparation
- Computational skill building – Introducing students to a variety of software applications and open-source tools
- Criticism of schooling – Multiple positions critical of compulsory schooling laws
- Glossary of education terms
- Grade inflation – Awarding higher grades than deserved
- Index of education articles
- List of countries by spending on education as percentage of GDP
- List of education articles by country
- Lists of academic journals
- Lists of books
- Outline of education – Overview of and topical guide to education
- Skill building – Skill sharing, and upskilling.
