= Ichthyosis bullosa of Siemens =

Ichthyosis Bullosa of Siemens
- Other names: Bullous type of ichthyosis
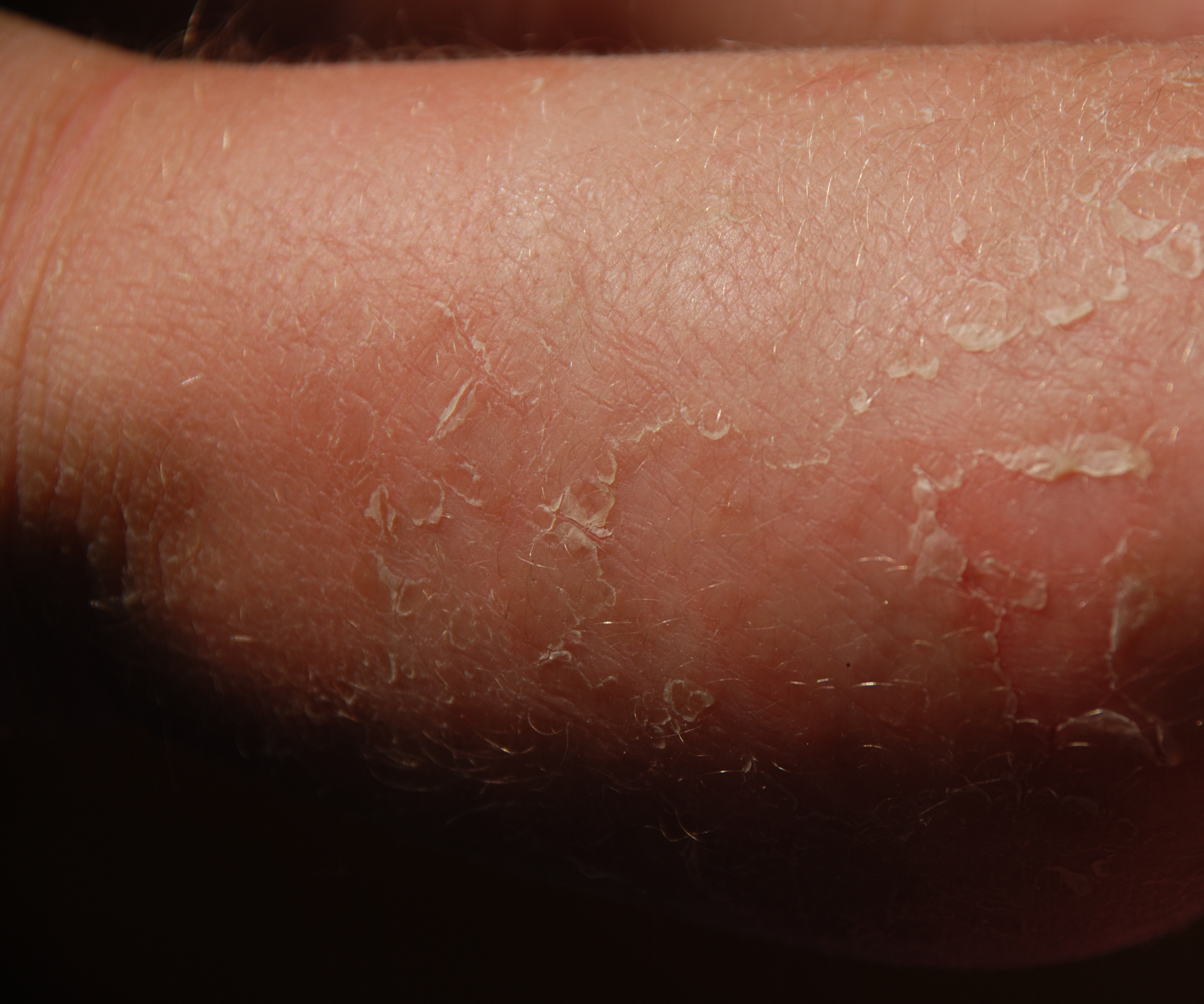
- Lower leg of a 12 month infant with ichthyosis bullosa of Siemens
- Specialty: Medical genetics

Ichthyosis bullosa of Siemens is a type of familial, autosomal dominant ichthyosis, a rare skin disorder. It is also known as bullous congenital ichthyosiform erythroderma of Siemens or ichthyosis exfoliativa. It is a genetic disorder with no known cure which is estimated to affect about 1 in 500,000 people.

== Symptoms and signs ==
Ichthyosis bullosa of Siemens has symptoms very similar to epidermolytic hyperkeratosis but is generally milder. Ichthyosis bullosa of Siemens affects only the upper layers of the epidermis whilst epidermolytic hyperkeratosis affects the suprabasal layer which is deeper in the skin.

At birth the baby's skin has a red appearance like a sun burn (erythema). Blistering is usually present at birth and may be extensive or localized depending on the severity of the disease.

Over the first few weeks the redness disappears and is replaced by dry, flaking skin on the arms, legs and around the belly button. Other areas of skin appear normal. The skin is fragile and is prone to blistering (caused by mild trauma or sweating). After a few months hyperkeratosis develops with a dark grey or brown, ridged appearance on the ankles, knees and elbows. Palms and soles are generally unaffected. A slightly unpleasant, sweet odour may be present.

A distinctive characteristic of ichthyosis bullosa of Siemens that is not present in other forms of ichthyosis is called the "Mauserung phenomenon" (Mauserung is German for "moulting" and was first described by H.W.Siemens). These are small patches of bare, apparently normal skin in the middle of areas of hyperkeratosis.

As the affected person ages the flaking and blistering should improve. The hyperkeratosis may grow more severe but more localized and is generally only present on flexural folds of the major joints.

== Genetics ==
Ichthyosis bullosa of Siemens is an autosomal dominant genetic condition caused by a mutation in the gene for keratin 2e on chromosome 12. This means an affected person has a 50% chance of passing the condition on to their child. However, in about half of cases, there is no parent with the condition the genetic fault is due to a spontaneous mutation.

== Diagnosis ==
Mild forms of ichthyosis bullosa of Siemens should be diagnosable from appearance and patient history alone. Severe cases are hard to distinguish from mild epidermolytic hyperkeratosis. A skin biopsy shows a characteristic damaged layer in the upper spinous level of the skin. It may be difficult to distinguish from epidermolytic hyperkeratosis.

The gene causing ichthyosis bullosa of Siemens is known and so a diagnosis can be confirmed by genetic testing.

== Treatments ==
Treatments for ichthyosis bullosa of Siemens generally attempt to improve the appearance of the skin and the comfort of the patient. This is done by exfoliating and increasing the moisture of the skin. Common treatments include:

- Emollients: moisturisers, petroleum jelly or other emollients are used, often several times a day, to increase the moisture of the skin.
- Baths: long baths (possibly including salt) several times a week are used to soften the skin and allow exfoliation.
- Exfoliating creams: creams containing keratolytics such as urea, salicylic acid and lactic acid may be useful.
- Antiseptic washes: antiseptics may be used to kill bacteria in the skin and prevent odour.
- Retinoids: very severe cases may use oral retinoids to control symptoms but these have many serious side effects including, an increase in blistering.

== History ==
Ichthyosis bullosa of Siemens was first described by the German dermatologist Hermann Werner Siemens in 1937 from his study of an affected family.

In 1994 the gene causing ichthyosis bullosa of Siemens was discovered. In the same year, it was also proved that ichthyosis exfoliativa is the same disease as ichthyosis bullosa of Siemens.

== See also ==
- List of cutaneous conditions
- List of cutaneous conditions caused by mutations in keratins
