= Keratin 2A =

Protein found in humans

KRT2

Identifiers
- Aliases: KRT2, CK-2e, K2e, KRT2A, KRT2E, KRTE, keratin 2
- External IDs: OMIM: 600194; MGI: 96699; GeneCards: KRT2

Gene location (Human)
Chr.	Chromosome 12 (human)
Band	12q13.13	Start	52,644,558 bp
Band	12q13.13	End	52,652,211 bp

Gene location (Mouse)
Chr.	Chromosome 15 (mouse)
Band	15 F2|15 57.03 cM	Start	101,719,124 bp
Band	15 F2|15 57.03 cM	End	101,726,604 bp
RNA expression pattern
Bgee	Human / Mouse (ortholog); Top expressed in: skin of arm; skin of thigh; skin of hip; skin of abdomen; nipple; human penis; gingival epithelium; vulva; palpebral conjunctiva; gastrocnemius muscle / Top expressed in: skin of external ear; lip; dentate gyrus of hippocampal formation granule cell; ankle; ankle joint; Ileal epithelium; entorhinal cortex; filiform papilla; stellate ganglion; ganglion of vagus nerve; More reference expression data
BioGPS	n/a
Gene ontology
Molecular function	structural constituent of cytoskeleton; protein binding; structural molecule activity; cytoskeletal protein binding; structural constituent of skin epidermis
Cellular component	keratin filament; extracellular exosome; membrane; nucleus; intermediate filament; extracellular space; cytosol; cornified envelope
Biological process	keratinocyte migration; keratinocyte activation; keratinocyte proliferation; intermediate filament organization; epidermis development; keratinocyte development; keratinization; cornification; peptide cross-linking; positive regulation of epidermis development
Sources:Amigo / QuickGO
Orthologs
Databases	NCBI: entry; OMA: entry
Species	Human	Mouse
Entrez	3849	16681
Ensembl	ENSG00000172867	ENSMUSG00000064201
UniProt	P35908	Q3TTY5
RefSeq (mRNA)	NM_000423	NM_010668
RefSeq (protein)	NP_000414	NP_034798
Location (UCSC)	Chr 12: 52.64 – 52.65 Mb	Chr 15: 101.72 – 101.73 Mb
PubMed search
- Wikidata
View/Edit Human	View/Edit Mouse

Keratin 2A also known as keratin 2E or keratin 2 is a protein that in humans is encoded by the KRT2A gene.

Keratin 2A is a type II cytokeratin. It is found largely in the upper spinous layer of epidermal keratinocytes and mutations in the gene encoding this protein have been associated with ichthyosis bullosa of Siemens.
