= Intelligence and education =

Study of the relationship of intelligence and education

The relationship between intelligence and education is one that scientists have been studying for years.

Typically if maternal and paternal IQ is high, it is very likely for the child to have a high IQ as well. A study conducted by Plug and Vijverberg showed that the environment that a child grows up in also affects his or her future academic performance. The children that were raised by their biological parents had a greater similarity in terms of intelligence and academic performance to their families than those raised by foster parents. Another study was conducted by Campbell and Ramey to test the socioeconomic effect on intelligence and it showed promising results for children at high risk of academic failure when there was an early intervention.

== Education as cause of intelligence ==
There is substantial evidence to suggest that education influences intelligence. According to a 2018 metastudy of educational effects on intelligence, education appears to be the "most consistent, robust, and durable method" known for raising intelligence. The study found "consistent evidence for beneficial effects of education on cognitive abilities of approximately 1 to 5 IQ points for an additional year of education".

== Intelligence as cause of educational outcomes ==
Longitudinal studies have shown a predictive interaction of intelligence on educational attainment. In one study which measured around 70,000 children in the UK, they investigated how a general factor in the Cognitive Abilities Test taken at age 11 correlated with GCSE scores taken at age 16. They found that the two measures correlated about 0.8 with each other, showing intelligence at age 11 is predictive of grades at age 16. In this instance, children had received the same level of education, suggesting the variance is explained primarily by differences in intelligence rather than education. The predictive effect of IQ on educational success is even apparent if IQ is measured before any formal education, with measured correlations of IQ at the beginning of education and educational attainment six year later correlating 0.46.

The military provides a natural example of how those with lower intelligence learn less effectively and benefit less from education. The effect has been demonstrated as far back as World War II in which military fighter pilots were divided into groups based on a selection battery which included ability and motivation measures. Those who were in the top group completed training the first time 95% of the time, whereas those in the bottom group only completed training 20% the first time. Examples of low level recruits have even led to disagreement over whether these men should be enlisted at all, as they are costly to train, perform at a lower level than average when trained, and simply cannot learn certain specialties. Even those in favor of hiring those who are less intelligent to the military acknowledge the limitations of these particular recruits, and instead try to get around the issue by adapting the training to cater for the mental ability of the less intelligent recruits. These findings demonstrate how intelligence is necessary for learning and any form of training, and that those who are more intelligent learn more rapidly and effectively than those who are less intelligent. This could explain the high correlations between intelligence and educational attainment.

== Interaction of education and intelligence ==
Evidence shows that education and intelligence have a complex interaction, and this is demonstrated in a longitudinal study by Richards and Sacker. They collected data from the British 1946 birth cohort and investigated how childhood intelligence was predictive of other outcomes later in life including educational attainment and mental ability at 53 years old (using the National Adult Reading Test). The results of the experiment produced a path model in which mental ability at 8 years old was predictive of both educational attainment by 26, and mental ability at age 53. And also, education was shown to be predictive of mental ability at age 53. The findings show that intelligence at 8 years old is directly related to intelligence in later life. There is also, however, a mediating effect of education between the two intelligence measures, showing how education can have a positive effect on intelligence. This effect, however, appears to be limited by the stronger effect of initial intelligence.

The Critical Thinking project at Human Science Lab, London, is involved in scientific study of all major educational systems in prevalence today to assess how the systems are working to promote or impede critical thinking and intelligence.

== Genes vs. environment ==
The argument as to whether intelligence leads to more education, or education leads to greater intelligence also needs to be considered in terms of nature vs nurture. The idea of intelligence influencing educational achievement stresses genes, whereas education's effect on intelligence stresses environment. The answer to this is rarely one or the other, but a combination of the two. It is important, however, to tease out the extent to which they influence one another.

=== Parental IQ and education ===
The relationship between IQ and academic performance has been shown to extend to one's children. In a study measuring a range of family background characteristics they found that maternal IQ was a stronger predictor of children's test scores than any other family characteristics, including socioeconomic status. Maternal IQ predicted around 10% of the variance, with the only other consistent predictor being ‘home scale scores’, which measured the intellectual stimulation of the home environment, and predicted around 2% of the variance. The paper argues that the inherited genetic traits are more important than environment when predicting academic success. This effect, however, could arise either because of inherited genetic traits, or because more intelligent parents place greater emphasis on academic achievement, meaning it is unclear how much influence genes have.

To investigate whether the relationship between intelligence and educational attainment was inherited, Plug and Vijverberg compared children raised by their biological parents and children who were adopted within their first year of life. They found that children who were raised by their birth parents were more similar to the family that raised them in terms of educational attainment and intelligence than those that were raised by an adopted family. They conclude that while ability is a predictor of educational attainment it is not the complete answer, leaving space for other influences, such as environment and parenting. They do argue, however, that the largest part of ability is inherited, with genetics explaining around 0.6 of the variance. This means the opposite effect, that education affects ability, is likely small.

=== Twin studies ===
An effective way to understand the genetic and environmental influences in behaviour is to use a Twin study. Johnson, Mcgue and Iacono investigated how factors that were present at age 11 influenced the change in grades to age 17 in pairs of twins. Using the Minnesota Twin Family Study, they investigated the genetic and environmental influences on intelligence and school performance. The results of the study found that around 70% of the variance in the education variables could be attributed to genetic influences. Furthermore, education outcomes had >56% of their genetic influences were shared with intelligence. This number dropped to 34% when other predictors of school grade such as engagement in class and family risk were included in the analysis, but this is still a large portion of shared genetic variance.

== Other predictors of educational success ==
=== Socioeconomic status ===
While intelligence is clearly a predictor of success in education, there may be other variables involved that affect this relationship. Socioeconomic status is one variable that often arises in this debate. In order to investigate this Campbell and Ramey used the results of the Abecedarian Project, which targeted children who were at high risk of academic failure and aimed to intervene and try to boost academic performance. The results showed promising improvements in IQ suggesting early intervention is important in ensuring children have the best chance of success, and socioeconomic status affects the IQ of children. On the other hand, while increases in IQ were observed, the best predictor of intellectual and academic achievement was still maternal IQ, which consistently explained twice the variance than that of the next best predictor. This demonstrates that while education and socioeconomic status influence IQ, it is still parental IQ that exert the strongest predictive effects.

=== Future outcomes and education ===
Research has found that education is important in reaching high level jobs, with correlations between education and job complexity being cited as high as 0.8. While this shows that education is important in successfully reaching, and performing, in high level jobs, general intelligence still plays an important role. Research has shown that an IQ of >120 is necessary to succeed in highly complex jobs such as those on an executive level. Gottfredson argues that this pattern emerges because even with sufficient training, people still need to attend to novel situations that they are not trained for and higher intelligence is required to successfully navigate the novel problems. These results demonstrate that even with a higher level of education, intelligence is still important in attaining higher level job positions.

== See also ==
- Educational psychology
