= Academic achievement =

Educational performance

Academic achievement or academic performance is the extent to which a student, teacher or institution has attained their short or long-term educational goals. Completion of educational benchmarks such as secondary school diplomas and bachelor's degrees represent academic achievement.

Academic achievement is commonly measured through examinations or continuous assessments but there is no general agreement on how it is best evaluated or which aspects are most important—procedural knowledge such as skills or declarative knowledge such as facts. Furthermore, there are inconclusive results over which individual factors successfully predict academic performance, elements such as test anxiety, environment, motivation, and emotions require consideration when developing models of school achievement.

In California, the achievement of schools is measured by the Academic Performance Index.

Academic achievement is sometimes also called educational excellence.

== Influencing factors ==
=== Individual differences ===
Individual differences in academic performance have been linked to differences in intelligence and personality. Students with higher mental ability as demonstrated by IQ tests and those who are higher in conscientiousness (linked to effort and achievement motivation) tend to achieve highly in academic settings. A recent meta-analysis suggested that mental curiosity (as measured by typical intellectual engagement) has an important influence on academic achievement in addition to intelligence and conscientiousness.

Children's semi-structured home learning environment transitions into a more structured learning environment when children start first grade. Early academic achievement enhances later academic achievement.

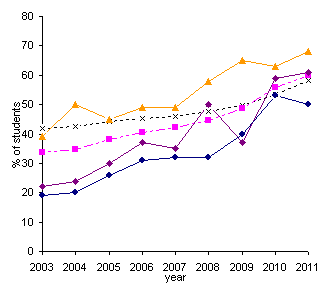
Chart of comparative performance in GCSE results

Parent's academic socialization is a term describing the way parents influence students' academic achievement by shaping students' skills, behaviors and attitudes towards school. Parents influence students through the environment and discourse parents have with their children. Academic socialization can be influenced by parents' socio-economic status. Highly educated parents tend to have more stimulating learning environments. Further, recent research indicates that the relationship quality with parents will influence the development of academic self-efficacy among adolescent-aged children, which will in turn affect their academic performance.

Children's first few years of life are crucial for the development of language and social skills. School preparedness in these areas helps students adjust to academic expectations. The significance of social relationships in educational contexts is widely recognized, particularly in how these relationships influence learning and academic performance. Notably, the characteristic of reciprocity within social relationships among children has been associated with enhanced academic performance.

Studies have shown that physical activity can increase neural activity in the brain, specifically increasing executive brain functions such as attention span and working memory; and improve academic performance in both elementary school children and college freshmen.

=== Non-cognitive factors ===
Non-cognitive factors or skills, are a set of "attitudes, behaviors, and strategies" that promotes academic and professional success, such as academic self-efficacy, self-control, motivation, expectancy and goal setting theories, emotional intelligence, and determination. To create attention on factors other than those measured by cognitive test scores sociologists Bowles & Gintis coined the term in the 1970s. The term serves as a distinction of cognitive factors, which are measured by teachers through tests and quizzes. Non-cognitive skills are increasingly gaining popularity because they provide a better explanation for academic and professional outcomes.

==== Motivation ====
Motivation is the reasoning behind an individual's actions. Research has found that students with higher academic performance, motivation and persistence use intrinsic goals rather than extrinsic ones. Furthermore, students who are motivated to improve upon their previous or upcoming performance tend to perform better academically than peers with lower motivation. In other words, students with higher need for achievement have greater academic performance.

==== Self-control ====
Self-control, in the academic setting, is related self-discipline, self-regulation, delay of gratification and impulse control. Baumeister, Vohs, and Tice defined self-control as "the capacity for altering one's own responses, especially to bring them into line with standards such as ideals, values, morals, and social expectations, and to support the attainment of long-term goals." In other words, self-control is the ability to prioritize long-term goals over the temptation of short-term impulses. Self-control is usually measured through self completed questionnaires. Researchers often use the Self-Control Scale developed by Tangney, Baumeister, & Boone in 2004.

Through a longitudinal study of the marshmallow test, researchers found a relationship between the time spent waiting for the second marshmallow and higher academic achievement. However, this finding only applied for participants who had the marshmallow in plain sight and were placed without any distraction tactics.

High locus of control, where an individual attributes success to personal decision making and positive behaviors such as discipline, is a ramification of self-control. High locus of control has been found to have a positive predictive relationship with high collegiate GPA.

=== Family structure ===
Family structure and involvement play a vital role in a child's education. There are multiple types of family structures. These family structures contribute in varying ways to a child's academic performance. Factors of the family structure that can influence the child include pressure from parents, parents' marital status, and family socioeconomic status.

==== Family Socio-economic Status ====
There are different types of socioeconomic stresses related to academics based on your family's income. The more affluent children tend to face problems such as symptoms of anxiety, increased normalization of substance abuse, and symptoms of depression as early as middle school. High-achieving students from this background tend to also face pressures from parents as well as society, which generally fails to account for their health and well-being. These conditions make learning and academic success more difficult, especially in post-secondary schooling.

The more economically disadvantaged tend to struggle to attain academic success due to problems with money and the culture around it. Though there is not one reason students perform worse on standardized measures of academic progress or success, such as the SAT and ACT, low-income students and districts perform worse on these tests. Some challenge whether the tests and metrics that measure academic success are fair.

=== Extracurricular activities ===
Organized extracurricular activities or cultural activities have yielded a positive relationship with high academic performance including increasing attendance rates, school engagement, GPA, postsecondary education, as well as a decrease in drop out rates and depression. Additionally, positive developmental outcomes have been found in youth that engage in organized extracurricular activities. High school athletics have been linked with strong academic performance, particularly among urban youth. However, involvement in athletics has been linked to increased alcohol consumption and abuse for high school students along with increased truancy.

While research suggests that there is a positive link between academic performance and participation in extracurricular activities, the mechanism behind this relationship is not always clear. Moreover, many unrelated factors influence the relationship between academic achievement and participation in extracurricular activities. These variables include: civic engagement, identity development, positive social relationships and behaviors, and mental health. In other research on youth, it was reported that positive social support and development, which can be acquired through organized after school activities is beneficial for achieving academic success. In terms of academic performance there are a whole other group of variables to consider. Some of these variables include: demographic and familial influences, individual characteristics, and program resources and content. For example, socio-economic status has been found to plays a role in the number of students participating in extracurricular activities. Furthermore, it is suggested that the peer relationships and support that develop in extracurricular activities often affect how individuals perform in school. With all these variables to consider it is important to create a better understanding how academic achievement can be seen in both a negative and positive light.

In conclusion, most research suggests that extracurricular activities are positively correlated to academic achievement. It has been mentioned that more research could be conducted to better understand the direction of this relationship. Together this information can give us a better understand the exact aspects to consider when considering the impact that participation in extracurricular activities can have on academic achievement.

=== Successful educational actions ===
There are experiences analysed by research projects that show how the incorporation of Successful Educational Actions (SEAs) in schools with high absenteeism are contributing to the improvement of academic achievement.

== See also ==
- Educational attainment
- Educational attainment in the United States
- Educational accreditation
- Intelligence and education
